= Cuscus =

Cuscus (/ˈkʌskʌs/ or /ˈkuːskuːs/) is a common name given to the species belonging to four genera of Australasian possums in the family Phalangeridae: Ailurops, Phalanger, Spilocuscus, and Strigocuscus. The name comes from the word kusu or kuso in some local related languages spoken in the Maluku Islands like Bacan and Ambonese Malay. It is also applied in parts of Indonesia to the Sunda slow loris, where people do not distinguish this from the "kuskus" possums. The loris, being a primate, is unrelated to the other cuscus species. Cuscus are marsupials, even though they have some appearances, traits and attributes like those of lemurs of Madagascar, which are prosimians, due to convergent evolution.

Cuscuses
Image	Genus	Species	Ref.
	Ailurops Wagler, 1830	Talaud bear cuscus, Ailurops melanotis (Temminck, 1824); Sulawesi bear cuscus, Ailurops ursinus (Thomas, 1898)	
	Phalanger Storr, 1780	Gebe cuscus, Phalanger alexandrae Flannery and Boeadi, 1995; Mountain cuscus, Phalanger carmelitae Thomas, 1898; Ground cuscus, Phalanger gymnotis (Peters and Doria, 1875); Eastern common cuscus, Phalanger intercastellanus Thomas, 1895; Woodlark cuscus, Phalanger lullulae Thomas, 1896; Blue-eyed cuscus, Phalanger matabiru Flannery and Boeadi, 1995; Telefomin cuscus, Phalanger matanim Flannery, 1987; Southern common cuscus, Phalanger mimicus Thomas, 1922; Northern common cuscus, Phalanger orientalis (Pallas, 1766); Ornate cuscus, Phalanger ornatus (Gray, 1860); Rothschild's cuscus, Phalanger rothschildi Thomas, 1898; Silky cuscus, Phalanger sericeus Thomas, 1907; Stein's cuscus, Phalanger vestitus (Milne-Edwards, 1877)	
	Spilocuscus Gray, 1862	Admiralty Island cuscus, Spilocuscus kraemeri (Schwartz, 1910); Common spotted cuscus, Spilocuscus maculatus (Geoffroy Saint-Hilaire, 1803); Waigeou cuscus, Spilocuscus papuensis (Desmarest, 1822); Black-spotted cuscus, Spilocuscus rufoniger (Zimara, 1937); Blue-eyed spotted cuscus, Spilocuscus wilsoni Helgen & Flannery, 2004	
	Strigocuscus Gray, 1862	Sulawesi dwarf cuscus, Strigocuscus celebensis (Gray, 1858); Banggai cuscus, Strigocuscus pelengensis) (Tate, 1945)	
