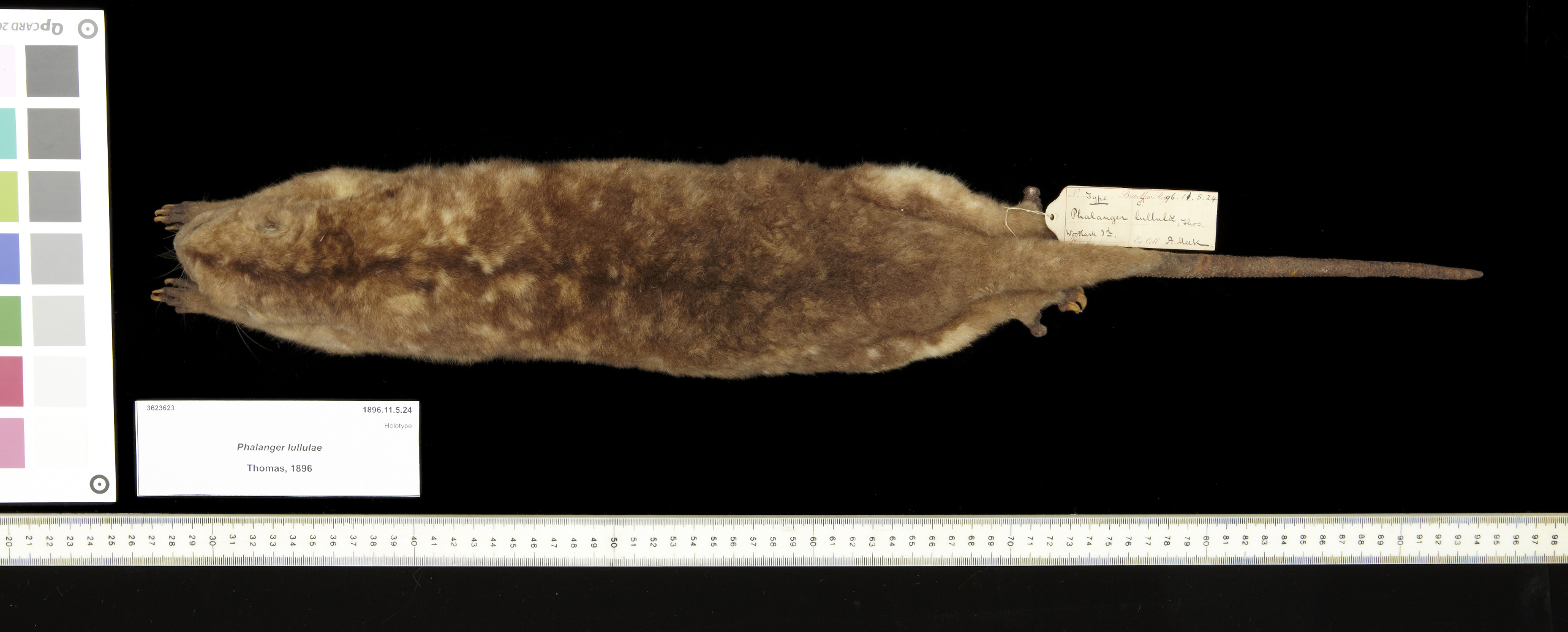
- 1896.11.5.24 Skin Dorsal Skins-1 MG 1555-S.jpg

Conservation status
- Endangered (IUCN 3.1)

Scientific classification
- Kingdom: Animalia
- Phylum: Chordata
- Class: Mammalia
- Infraclass: Marsupialia
- Order: Diprotodontia
- Family: Phalangeridae
- Genus: Phalanger
- Species: P. lullulae

Binomial name
- Phalanger lullulae Thomas, 1896
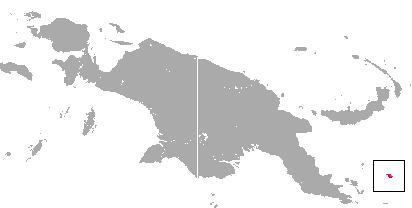
- Woodlark cuscus range

= Woodlark cuscus =

Species of marsupial

The Woodlark cuscus (Phalanger lullulae) is a species of marsupial in the family Phalangeridae endemic to Papua New Guinea, specifically on Madau and Woodlark Island, a part of the Milne Bay Province of Papua New Guinea. It happens to be the largest mammal living on Woodlark Island but it is also found on the neighboring island of Alcester, 70 kilometers south of Woodlark Island.

== Etymology ==
The generic name, Phalanger, is of Greek origin and means "spider's web." This name is given in reference to their syndactyly that exists on their hind feet. Its specific name, lullulae, is Latin in origin and is the Latin translation of "Woodlark."

== Phylogeny ==
In a phylogenetic tree published in 1987 by Tim Flannery and his colleagues, Phalanger lullulae was believed to share the same states with Phalanger intercastellanus also known as the Eastern common cuscus. A morphological consensus tree shows that the P. lullulae is related to the mountain cuscus (Phalanger carmelatie), P. interpositus, Stein's cuscus (P. vestitus), and the Banggai cuscus (Strigocuscus pelengensis). This phylogenetic tree was created by Tim Flannery and his colleagues in 1987 but was also reanalyzed by Ruedas and Morales in 2005. A partial 12S rRNA ML tree by Ruedas and Morales demonstrated the firstly mentioned relationship between the P. lullulae and P. intercastellanus. The Partial 12S rRNA ML tree by Hamilton and Springer demonstrated that the P. lullulae is most closely related to the Northern common cuscus (P. orientalis). An ML tree of the nuclear gene BRCA1 created by Raterman and his colleagues shows the P. lullulae's close relationship to the P. orientalis as well. While these aforementioned phylogenies are more certain, there is another proposed morphological phylogeny by Flannery that demonstrates the uncertainty of the P. lullulae's relationship among the P. orientalis and P. vestitus.

== Physical appearance ==
The Woodlark cuscus is overall a medium-sized marsupial with dark facial skin, very small pink colored ears, and a pink rhinarium. While they are medium-sized, the females, on average, tend to be slightly larger than the males.

=== Skull ===
What sets these cuscuses apart from other diprotodont marsupials is the back part of the cranium not being so exposed to the mastoid. Its skull is in the shape of a pear and its widest portion of the skull can be found in the posterior end of its zygomatic arch. While the molars do not undergo strong crenulation, the nasal bones extend and stop where the premaxilla stops. Its dentition continues with the cingulum being quite large and very well-developed and sitting between the lopids of the lower molars. The backside of the skull where the paroccipital processes are located are longer in comparison to the rest of the skull.

=== Fur ===
What also sets this marsupial apart from all of the others is its short fur which is marble-like with a mix of white, dark brown, and ginger spots on its back and a white underbelly. Because the mixture is so varied between each Woodlark cuscus, you will never find two of these marsupials with exactly the same coat pattern on its back. While this is true, the species can be divided into two groups: light morphs and dark morphs. Light morphs have the lighter color mixture on their coats so they would have more of the white and ginger colors accompanied by small patches of dark fur. Dark morphs have the darker color mixture on their coats, sporting more of the dark brown along with some patches of white fur. While both morphs are adorned with a dark dorsal stripe on their backs, it is more easily recognizable on the light morphs.

The fur continues on along the tail of this possum but abruptly stops once the distal portion of the tail is reached to reveal a hairless tail. This naked part of the tail is dark much like its face and is a bit rugose but since it is also prehensile, it allows for the tail to be used for gripping.

== Habitat ==
This possum lives its arboreal life in primary and secondary tropical forests with a preference for the dry lowland forest. The hunters on Woodlark Island claim that the Phalanger lullalae finds shelter under the epiphytes and inside tree hollows during the day. Since the dry lowland forest makes up the Eastern half of Woodlark Island, there is a higher prominence of these possums here compared to the dense rain forests of the Western half of the Island.

== Reproduction and development ==
The behaviors that occur among male and female Woodlark cuscus before, during, and after mating have not yet been observed. However, the capture of five female Woodlark cuscuses in August 1987 led to the following interesting observations: one of the females were parous but did not have any young while another was clearly lactating. Two others had its naked young in their pouches while one of them had its older young on its back. This transition from the pouch of the mother to the back of the mother as the young age is typical in the Phalanger lullulae because they are metatherians and this transition is typical metatherian behavior. The various states of the young and female cuscuses were in demonstrate that the breeding season most likely happens over a long period of time. It has also been noted that they give birth to single young.

Another aspect of the Woodlark cuscus' metatherian identity can be seen the composition of the mother's milk. As the young grow, the carbohydrate, lipid, and protein compositions in the mother's milk fluctuates in accordance to the stage the young P. lullulae is in as it grows. The tiny young will feed on milk that is very dilute and composed of simple sugars while the older ones feed on more concentrated milk.

== Behavior ==
Thanks to Oxford University's journey to Woodlark Island, they were able to note and monitor the behavior of the Woodlark cuscus by using radio tracking techniques. These studies revealed that the cuscus is a solitary animal and the activities of the cuscus surround the few sleeping trees they come in contact with. They sleep during the day so they are nocturnal and their arboreal lifestyle lends them the opportunity to forage for food in the upper regions of trees while they nest in the lower regions of trees that are designated for sleeping. While foraging, they will make a variety of vocalizations to communicate from barking to snarling as a whining cry which sounds much like that of a human infant. When they interact, they have proven to be quite aggressive towards each other. With four species of bats living on the island, they are seen as potential competitors with the cuscuses. When obtaining food, they may eat the secondary regrowth from the tree and vine Rhus taitensis which grows quickly and contains the nectar which the locals on the island claim that they enjoy. Other sources indicate that they eat two species of vine which have yet to be identified.

== Threat and conservation ==
Before 1987, there were only eight specimens of Woodlark cuscuses identified so it was believed that the species was in fact on the brink of extinction. Observations in 1987 showed that they are rampant on the Eastern half of Woodlark Island and on Alcester Island, however, they were still considered vulnerable by the IUCN because of their restricted inhabitance. Currently, it is listed as endangered by the IUCN. While the Woodlark cuscus are hunted by the locals, it plays only a small part in the diet of the locals and does not impact its abundance on the islands. The biggest threat to these cuscuses would have to be the planned palm oil development by a Malaysian biofuels company. While it is not known how massive this project is, regardless of its magnitude, it will have adverse effects on the native forests on the island and will mark their end. The introduction of other Phalanger species could be a threat as they are potential competitors as well a means of disease transmission to the native Woodlark cuscus.
