= List of marsupials described in the 2000s =

The following is a list of marsupials which have been taxonomically described in the 2000s.

Species of the infraclass Marsupialia of mammals discovered and described in the 2000s.

== New species list ==
- Arfak pygmy bandicoot — Microperoryctes aplini (2004).
- Mountain brushtail possum — Trichosurus cunninghami (2002).
- Short-eared possum — Trichosurus caninus (2002).
- Red-bellied gracile opossum Cryptonanus ignitus (2002).

== Taxonomy ==
In 2002 it was discovered that the originally named mountain brush-tailed possum of Australia actually consists of two separate species. Due to taxonomic rules, the northern population has been renamed with the common name short-eared possum but will keep the scientific name Trichosurus caninus, while the southern population has been named with the common and scientific names mountain brush-tailed possum (Trichosurus cunninghami). This is because the original type specimen of the species was from the northern population, and therefore must keep the original scientific name.

== See also ==
- Marsupials topics
