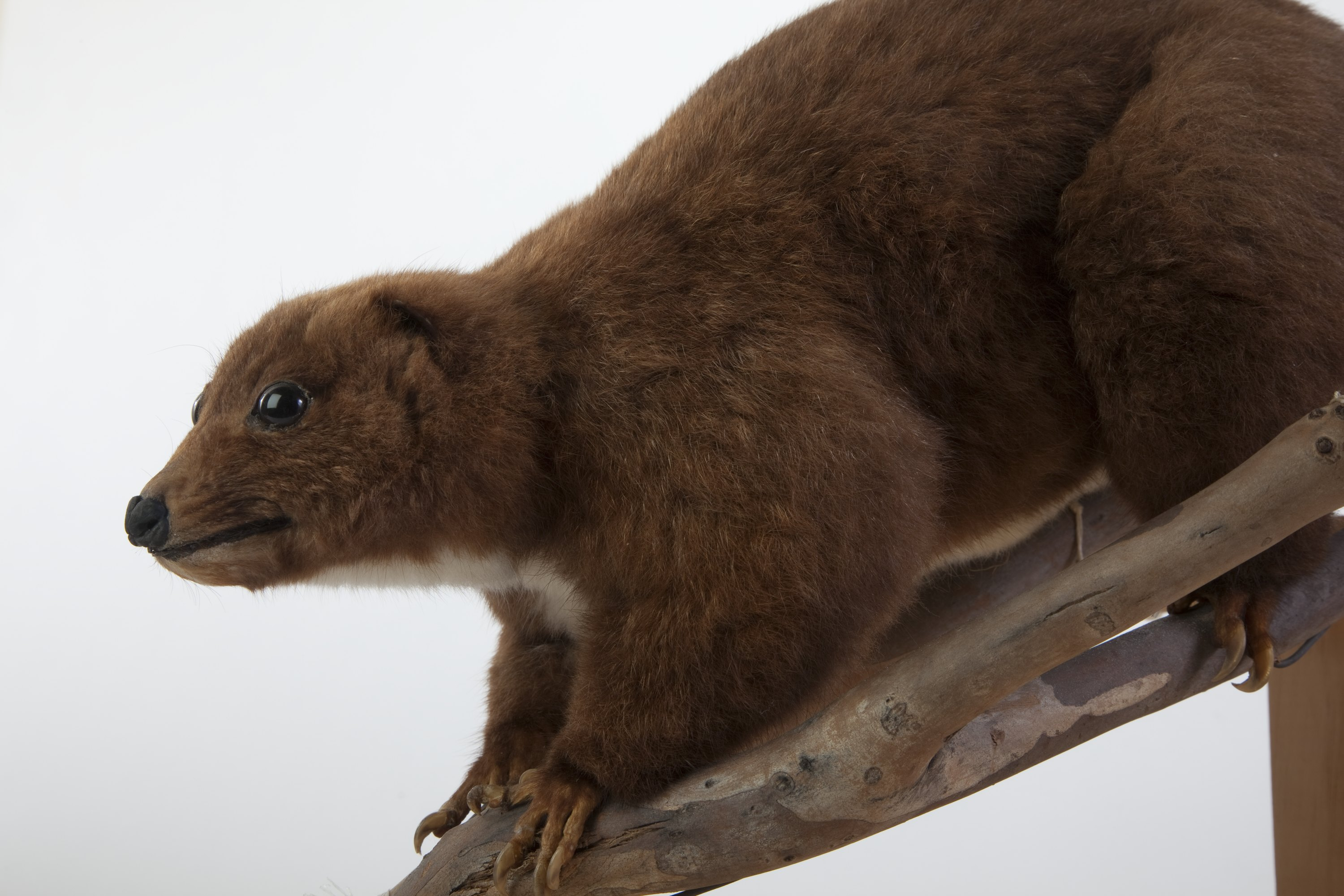

Conservation status
- Least Concern (IUCN 3.1)

Scientific classification
- Kingdom: Animalia
- Phylum: Chordata
- Class: Mammalia
- Infraclass: Marsupialia
- Order: Diprotodontia
- Family: Phalangeridae
- Genus: Phalanger
- Species: P. carmelitae

Binomial name
- Phalanger carmelitae Thomas, 1898
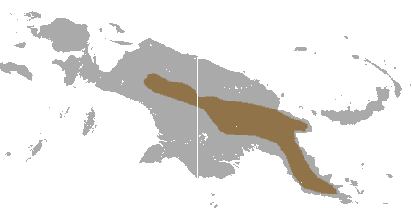
- Mountain cuscus range

= Mountain cuscus =

Species of marsupial

The mountain cuscus (Phalanger carmelitae) is a marsupial in the family Phalangeridae found throughout the central mountain ranges and Huon Peninsula of New Guinea, in both West Papua, Indonesia and Papua New Guinea. It lives in undisturbed montane forests at elevations between 1,350 and 3,800 m (4,430 and 12,470 ft). The species is nocturnal and arboreal, feeding mainly on leaves and fruit. It was first described by Oldfield Thomas in 1898 and includes two recognized subspecies. The mountain cuscus is currently listed as Least Concern on the IUCN Red List.

== Taxonomy ==
The mountain cuscus belongs to the family Phalangeridae and the genus Phalanger. It was first described by Oldfield Thomas in 1898 in a paper titled "Descriptions of two new cuscuses (Phalanger) obtained by Dr. Loria in British New Guinea," published in the Annali del Museo civico di storia naturale di Genova. The type locality is the mountainous part of the Vanapa River in what is now Central Province, Papua New Guinea. The type specimen is held at the Natural History Museum in London.

Two subspecies are recognized: the nominate P. c. carmelitae Thomas, 1898, found throughout the Central Range, and P. c. coccygis Thomas, 1922, found on the Huon Peninsula. The species was previously treated as a subspecies of P. vestitus by Tate (1945) before being recognized as its own species.

== Description ==
The mountain cuscus has a head-body length of 37–43 cm, a tail length of 31–36.5 cm, and weighs 1.7–2.6 kg. Its thick, woolly fur is dark, ranging from chocolate-brown to blackish and occasionally dark grayish-brown, on the back, with a white belly. The tail is black with a white distal tip and is coarsely tuberculated. The skull is medium-sized, with a condylobasal length of 70–88 mm, a relatively short rostrum, a large posterior upper premolar and molars, the second upper premolar always present, and three unicuspids on each side of the lower jaw.

The mountain cuscus is most easily confused with the silky cuscus (P. sericeus), which differs in having a smooth tail without tuberculation, a shorter or absent white tail tip, the second upper premolar absent, and usually only one or two unicuspids on each side of the lower jaw.

== Behavior ==
The mountain cuscus is nocturnal and arboreal, resting during the day in tree hollows and in tangles of epiphytes and Pandanus fronds. At night it spends approximately 40% of its time feeding, around 25% resting, and the remainder traveling. Males have been recorded using 11–13 dens per year, spaced an average of 115 m apart, while females use 12–19 dens per year spaced an average of 124 m apart.

Male mountain cuscuses move at an average speed of 59 m/h across a home range of approximately 4 ha, while females travel at an average of 37 m/h across home ranges of 2–8 ha. Adjacent home ranges overlap only slightly, with male home ranges overlapping by an average of 0–22% and female home ranges by only 0–5%. The population trend is considered stable.

== Mating ==
Female mountain cuscuses give birth to a single young. Births have been recorded in February, April, August, and September, suggesting year-round breeding.

== Habitat and environment ==
The mountain cuscus lives in montane forests throughout the central mountain ranges and Huon Peninsula of New Guinea, at elevations between 1,350 and 3,800 m (4,430 and 12,470 ft). It prefers undisturbed primary forest and is rarely found in areas that have been cleared or degraded. It shares its habitat with several other cuscus species, including the silky cuscus, Stein's cuscus, the ground cuscus, and the Telefomin cuscus, especially in the Star Mountains region. The species is found within at least one National Park, several Wildlife Management Areas, and the YUS Conservation Area on the Huon Peninsula.

== Diet ==
The mountain cuscus is primarily a leaf-eater, with leaves making up around 80% of its diet. Fruit makes up approximately 18–20%, with small amounts of flowers and bark also consumed. Plants recorded in the diet include Freycinetia, Garcinia, Helicia, Ilex, Litsea, Pandanus, Podocarpus, Sphenostemon, and Syzygium. A captive individual was also observed eating leaves of Acalypha, softer parts of Casuarina stems, Pandanus fruits, and epiphytic orchids. The same individual reportedly killed and ate a pet lorikeet that was placed in the same enclosure.

== Human interactions ==
The mountain cuscus is hunted by local people for food throughout much of its range. Significant habitat loss is also taking place in parts of its range, mostly through deforestation for subsistence agriculture. Despite these pressures, the species is considered abundant in suitable habitat where it is not hunted.

The mountain cuscus is currently listed as Least Concern on the IUCN Red List, due to its wide distribution, presumed large population, and occurrence in protected areas. It has been assessed as Least Concern since at least 1996. The development of hunting regulations has been recommended in parts of its range where it is not already protected.
