= Archerus =

Archerus Temporal range: Early Miocene–Middle Miocene

Scientific classification
- Kingdom: Animalia
- Phylum: Chordata
- Class: Mammalia
- Infraclass: Marsupialia
- Order: Diprotodontia
- Family: Phalangeridae
- Genus: †Archerus; Myers & Crosby, 2023

Type species
- †Archerus johntoniae Myers & Crosby, 2023

Extinct genus of marsupials

Archerus is a genus of extinct marsupials from Miocene Australia. It is known from jawbones and partial skulls from the Riversleigh World Heritage Area in Queensland, dated to between 18 to 12 million years ago. These are sufficient to identify it as a phalangerid, perhaps more closely related to the brushtail possums than to the cuscuses, but with many distinctive skeletal features that make the latter relationship uncertain; it may have lived before the two branches of the living family diverged from one another. It is estimated to have weighed around 1.3 kg (2.9 lb), similar to the living scaly-tailed possum, and the shape of its teeth suggest that it had a similarly omnivorous diet.
