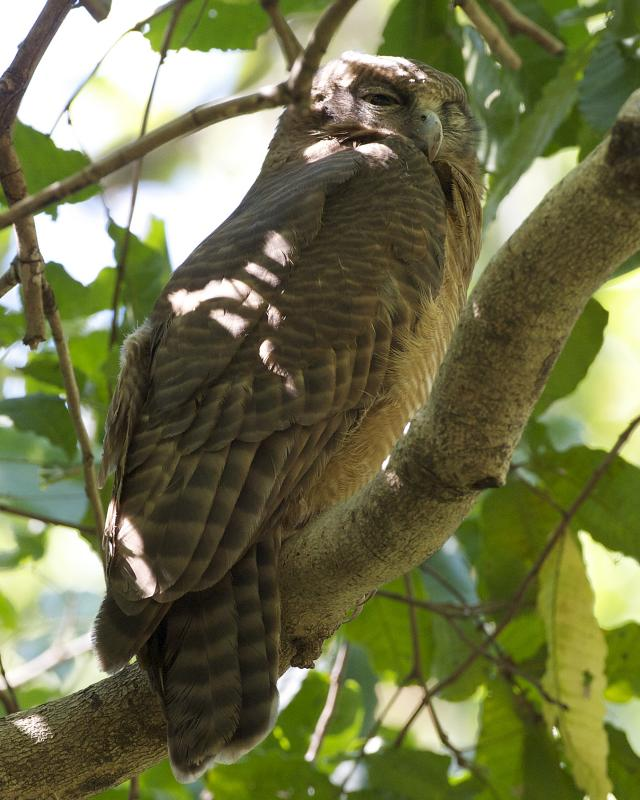

Conservation status
- Least Concern (IUCN 3.1)
- CITES Appendix II

Scientific classification
- Kingdom: Animalia
- Phylum: Chordata
- Class: Aves
- Order: Strigiformes
- Family: Strigidae
- Genus: Ninox
- Species: N. rufa

Binomial name
- Ninox rufa (Gould, 1846)

= Rufous owl =

Species of owl

The rufous owl (Ninox rufa), also known as the rufous boobook, is a species of owl in the family Strigidae. It was described in 1846 by John Gould, an English ornithologist. Its common name reflects the rufous-coloured feathers that these owls are covered with in adulthood. While it is uncommon, the species has a wide range, including Australia, Indonesia, and Papua New Guinea.

The rufous owl is a large owl species, ranging in weight from 700 to 1,700 g (25 to 60 oz), depending on sex and age. It is only slightly smaller than the largest owl in Australia, the powerful owl (Ninox strenua), which typically weighs between 1,050 and 1,700 g (37 and 60 oz). The rufous owl is a generalist nocturnal predator and generally solitary. It is seldom aggressive to humans except in situations in which it feels its nest or offspring are threatened.

== Description ==
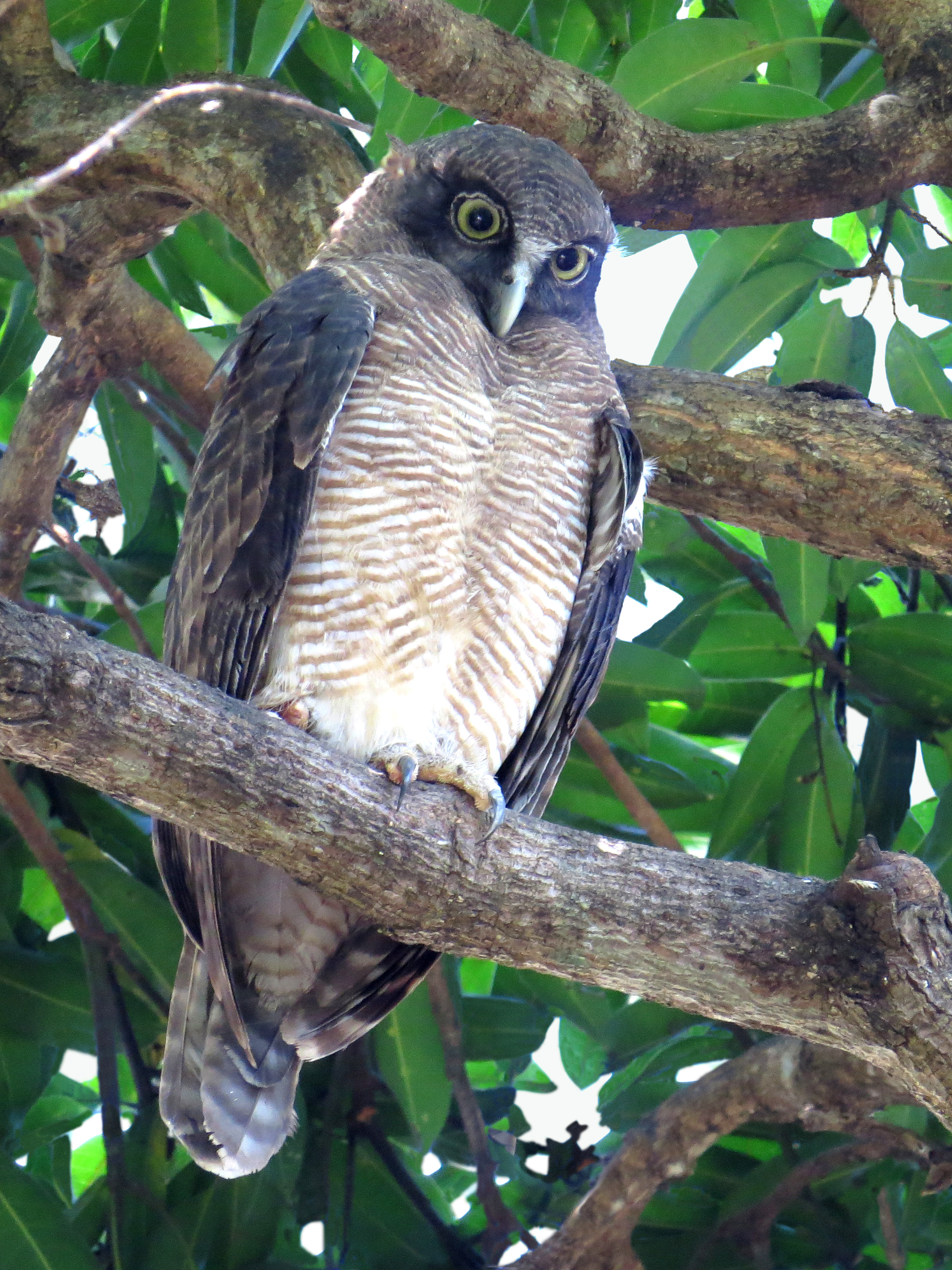
subspecies queenslandica

The rufous owl is a large bird, often growing to 46–57 cm (18–22 in) in length, with a wingspan of 100 to 120 cm (39 to 47 in). Females typically weigh 700–1,050 g (25–37 oz), while the males typically weigh 1,050–1,300 g (37–46 oz). Both sexes have relatively small heads compared to their body and tail, but the head of the male is flatter and broader than that of the female. Juveniles are much smaller, usually 49–54 mm (1.9–2.1 in) long at birth, and are covered in downy white pelage. The forehead, neck, back, and upper wings of the adults are usually a dark reddish-brown with light brown barring scattered throughout. The face is dark brown, and the neck, breast and underparts are rufous with thin cream bars. The underside of the wings are light brown with thick cream bars. The hooked bill is light grey and is surrounded by black bristles at its base. It has golden-yellow eyes.

== Subspecies ==
The five subspecies differ slightly in size and colour. They include:

- Ninox rufa humeralis (Bonaparte, 1850) — Waigeo
- Ninox rufa rufa (Gould, 1846) — Kimberley and Top End
- Ninox rufa aruensis (Schlegal, 1866) — Aru Islands
- Ninox rufa meesi (I.J. Mason & Schodde, 1980) — northeastern cape York Peninsula
- Ninox rufa queenslandica (Matthews, 1911) — southeastern cape York Peninsula.

== Distribution and habitat ==
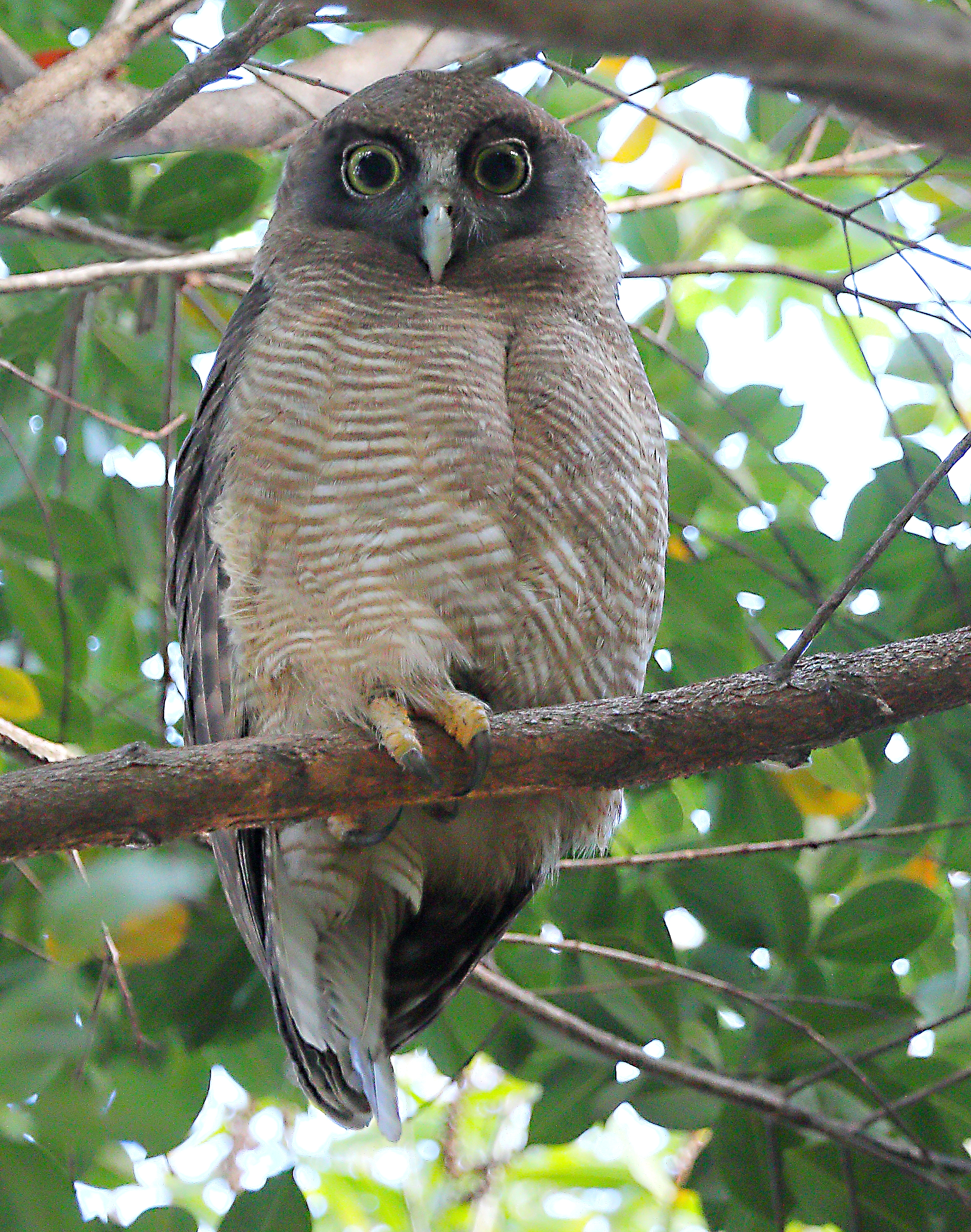
Male rufous owl, Cairns

The rufous owl has a wide geographic range. It is native to the Aru Islands, New Guinea and northern Australia, where it is found in Arnhem Land, the northern Kimberleys, the eastern Cape York Peninsula, and the Mackay Region of eastern Queensland. It is the only exclusively tropical owl in Australia. The global population size of Ninox rufa has yet to be determined, but the species is considered uncommon to rare.

The owl inhabits terrestrial ecosystems. It is mainly found in rainforests and the margins of rainforests. Additional habitats may include other forests, moist savannas, and inland wetlands.

== Behaviour ==
Rufous owls are characterised by having rather shy and elusive natures but are known to become aggressive if threatened. They are almost exclusively nocturnal birds and will remain in their nest or roost during the day. They are generally not very vocal, except during the breeding season. During this time, males and females will communicate to one another using calls of various pitches. The voice of the female is of a higher pitch than the male's.

=== Breeding ===
The rufous owl has a regular breeding season from June to September, depending on the warmth of its habitat. To initiate breeding, the male will utter a double call which will attract a female to him. As she flies toward him, the female will give excited trills in return. Eggs are typically laid in a nest located in the trunks or limbs of trees. Some nests are built as high as thirty meters above the ground in order to protect them from ground-dwelling predators. The male owl will select the nest and the female will lay one or two eggs inside. The eggs require 37 days of incubation. Once hatched, the young owls are dependent on their parents for many months, often until the following breeding season. The adult males and females will both aggressively defend their nests against predators and intruders while the young still reside inside.

=== Feeding ===
The rufous owl is a skilled and powerful hunter, capable of capturing a wide variety of prey. Their diet is extremely diverse, ranging from birds and insects to small mammals such as flying foxes. Mammal prey sizes have been recorded from small rodents of 5 to 15 g to larger arboreal marsupials such as the Northern brushtail possum (1100 to 2000 g). Typically, the rufous owl will hunt the juveniles of these larger prey species. Mammals that the rufous owl has been documented to feed upon include the following: little red flying fox (Pteropus scapulatus), black flying fox (Pteropus alecto), brush-tailed phascogale (Phascogale tapoatafa), northern brushtail possum (Trichosurus arnhemensis), sugar glider (Petaurus breviceps), black-footed tree-rat (Mesembriomys gouldii), brush-tailed rabbit rat (Conilurus penicillatus), northern brown bandicoot (Isoodon macrourus), pale field rat (Rattus tunneyi), dusky field rat (Rattus colletti), and others. They also take birds such as orange-footed scrubfowl (Megapodius reinwardt) and eclectus parrot (Eclectus roratus).

Seasonal changes in selection of prey have been determined from one study in Australia. For instance, when ground vegetation is more dense during the wet season, these owls appear to prey more often on other birds than ground-dwelling mammals. Selection of prey is also largely dependent upon the availability of species during the different seasons. In order to catch their prey, rufous owls have been observed to utilize several predation methods. They may take prey from perches, snatch from tree foliage while in flight, chase while in flight, or swoop from the air and catch their prey from the ground or water below.

== Conservation ==
According to the IUCN Red List of Threatened Species, Ninox rufa is not listed as a vulnerable species. It was most recently classified in 2016 as a species of least concern. While its population size does appear to be decreasing, its rate of decline is not considered rapid enough to be considered under the vulnerable category. The species has experienced less than 30% decline over the last ten years or three generations. However, the rufous owl, like many other birds, is subject to the threats of hunting, clearing of forests, and forest fires during the dry season.
