= Scaly-tailed possum =

Conservation status
- Near Threatened (IUCN 3.1)

Scientific classification
- Kingdom: Animalia
- Phylum: Chordata
- Class: Mammalia
- Infraclass: Marsupialia
- Order: Diprotodontia
- Family: Phalangeridae
- Genus: Wyulda
- Species: W. squamicaudata

Binomial name
- Wyulda squamicaudata Alexander, 1918
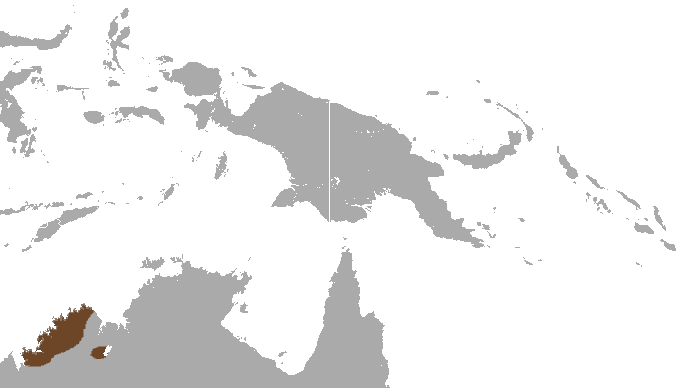
- Scaly-tailed possum range

Species of marsupial

The scaly-tailed possum (Wyulda squamicaudata) is found in northwestern Australia, where it is restricted to the Kimberley.

They are light grey over most of the body and have relatively short ears and muzzle. The mostly hairless tail is able to curl around the branches of trees as the possum forages for food, its grasp is aided by rasp-ilke scales and is strong enough to hold its own weight. The species favours complex rocky terrain with dense thickets of vines and the fruiting trees that provide much of their diet.

== Taxonomy ==
The new species was presented to the Royal Society of Western Australia in 1918 by the biologist Wilfred Backhouse Alexander, while he was employed by the Western Australian Museum, and published in the society's journal in the same year. The description was accompanied by a reproduction of a painting by George Pitt Morison, and two photographs of the specimen's skull were also included. The holotype was reported to have been collected in the Kimberley region at Violet Valley Station, and forwarded to Walter Kingsmill who presented the specimen to the Perth Zoological Gardens. Alexander assigned the species to a new genus of the phalangerid family, Wyulda, deriving the name from an indigenous word used by the people at Lyons River for the local and common possum; the pronunciation provided by the author is "weeoolda".

Aside from scaly-tailed possum, the recorded names for the species include ilangurra and yilangal (the latter by the Wunambal people of Mitchell Plateau). The describing author proposed the common name scaly-tailed opossum, but gave an alternative as scaly tailed phalanger if the use of the term for the American marsupial opossum was considered inappropriate. As the common name implies, its distinguishing feature is a hairless, scaly tail.

== Description ==
An arboreal species of the Phalangeridae family with short ears and muzzle, and a body with a stocky build. The total length of the head and body is 300 to 390 millimetres (12 to 15 in), the distinctive tail is 300 millimetres (12 in), and their weight ranges from 1.3 to 2.0 kilograms (2.9 to 4.4 lb). The coloration of the pelage is light grey with brown flecking over the upper parts, becoming a rufous colour toward the base of tail and over the rump; an indistinct mid-line extends along the back of the possum, from the tail to between the eyes. The fur at the underside is creamy white. A densely furred region extends a short distance over the base of the tail, which is otherwise naked. Wyulda squamicaudata is distinguished by rasp-like scales over the surface of their strongly prehensile tail.

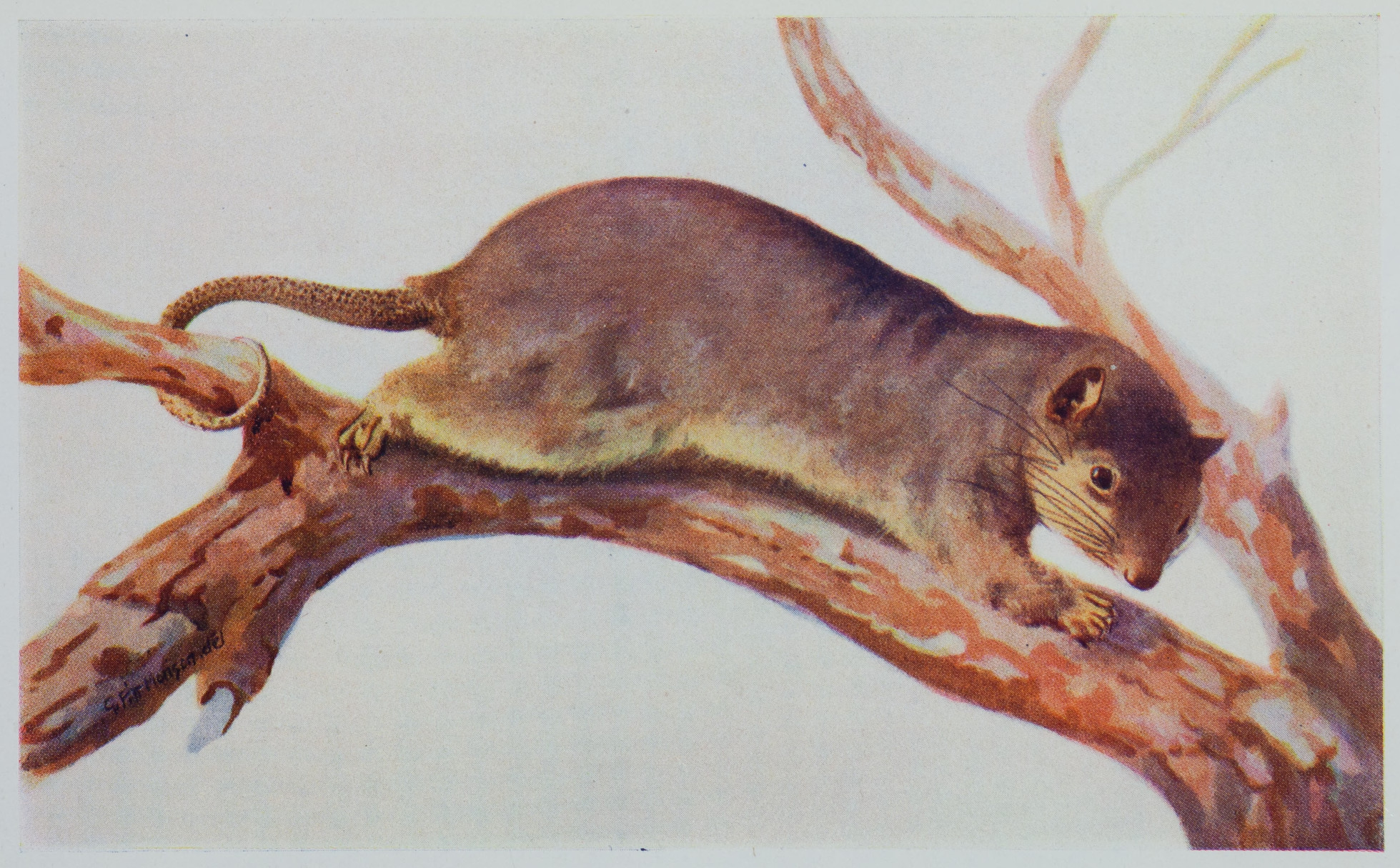
Reproduction of George Pitt Morison's painting of the species, published with the first description, 1918

Wyulda squamicaudata is a slow growing species, the rate of increase in skull length for juveniles is 0.26 mm per day. The weight when the female reaches a reproductive age at two years old is 1.1 kg (2.4 lb). less than the weight range of fully mature individuals. There is no difference in weight between genders and is not known to be seasonally variable.

The species has been allied within the family Phalangeridae as a relation of other Australasian genera, the cuscuses Phalanger and brushtail possums Trichosurus. Superficially similar to other possum species, the observable differences from the commonly found possum Trichosurus vulpecula are the fox-like face, furry tail and larger of that species. Another rock inhabiting possum found in the region, the ringtail species Petropseudes dahli, has fur covering half the tail, patches of white near the ears, and a steep forehead and pointed muzzle when observed in profile.

The parasites known to use Wyulda squamicaudata as a host include internal species, the cestode Bertiella trichosuri also found in possums of Trichosurus, Adelenema trichosuri and a species of Austrostrongylus, a genus associated with wallabies.

== Behaviour ==
Wyulda squamicaudata is a nocturnal animal that usually occurs alone. Their behaviour is discreet and shy while foraging in trees or over rocks. They demonstrate great agility when climbing, assisted by a prehensile tail that is strong enough to support themselves from a branch while reaching for leaves and other food. Reproduction takes place during the dry season of north west Australia, usually between March and August and occasionally giving birth later in that season. The maternal rearing period of the young includes 150 to 200 days within the pouch and another eight months to become independent of the mother; reproductive maturity for the female is reached after two years.

Usually found in denser wooded areas, W. squamicaudata may be seen foraging in open areas. The diet largely includes leaves, seeds, roots and flowering parts of plants, although nuts and insects are also consumed. A study of the species found that up to three quarters of the diet is composed of fruits.

== Distribution and habitat ==
The possum has a limited range and is found in the high rainfall near coastal regions of the north Kimberley between Yampi Sound and Kalumburu, and a smaller population that occurs inland in the east Kimberley at Emma Gorge.

Wyulda squamicaudata is most widely reported across the Artesian Range, where it is moderately common. Populations also inhabit Bigge Island and Boongaree Island. The preferred habitat of this animal is sandstone based woodlands where it can shelter in rock piles and fissures and feed in the trees. They are associated with denser vegetation over rocks and boulders that provide daytime shelter and refuge, often thickets of vines rather than the closed mangrove and open woodlands favoured by Trichosurus arnhemensis. The species is restricted in its range by the complexity of a rocky habitat, providing more dens and refuge from fires in the surrounding landscape.

The species' type location is in the eastern Kimberley, at Violet Valley near Warmun, but most records are of their occurrence are in the north-west of the region. The specimen obtained in 1917 was the only record of the possum in east Kimberley region until 2010, when they were found occurring at Emma Gorge in the Cockburn Range. The eastern and north-western groups may be geographically isolated, but this has not been confirmed by a broad survey of the Kimberley region. It is present in the Charnley River–Artesian Range Wildlife Sanctuary in the Kimberley region of WA.

Wyulda squamicaudata has disappeared at some locations, where they are assumed to have succumbed to frequent and higher intensity fires and predation by feral cats. An outlying occurrence in Broome reported in 1970 is thought have been a displaced individual.

The northern brushtail possum Trichosurus arnhemensis occurs in the same region as this species, but does not appear to share the same habitat.

== Conservation ==
The IUCN Red List assigns a conservation status of near threatened for the species. The population was assessed in 2014 as numbering between 5000 and 10,000 with evidence that it is decreasing.
