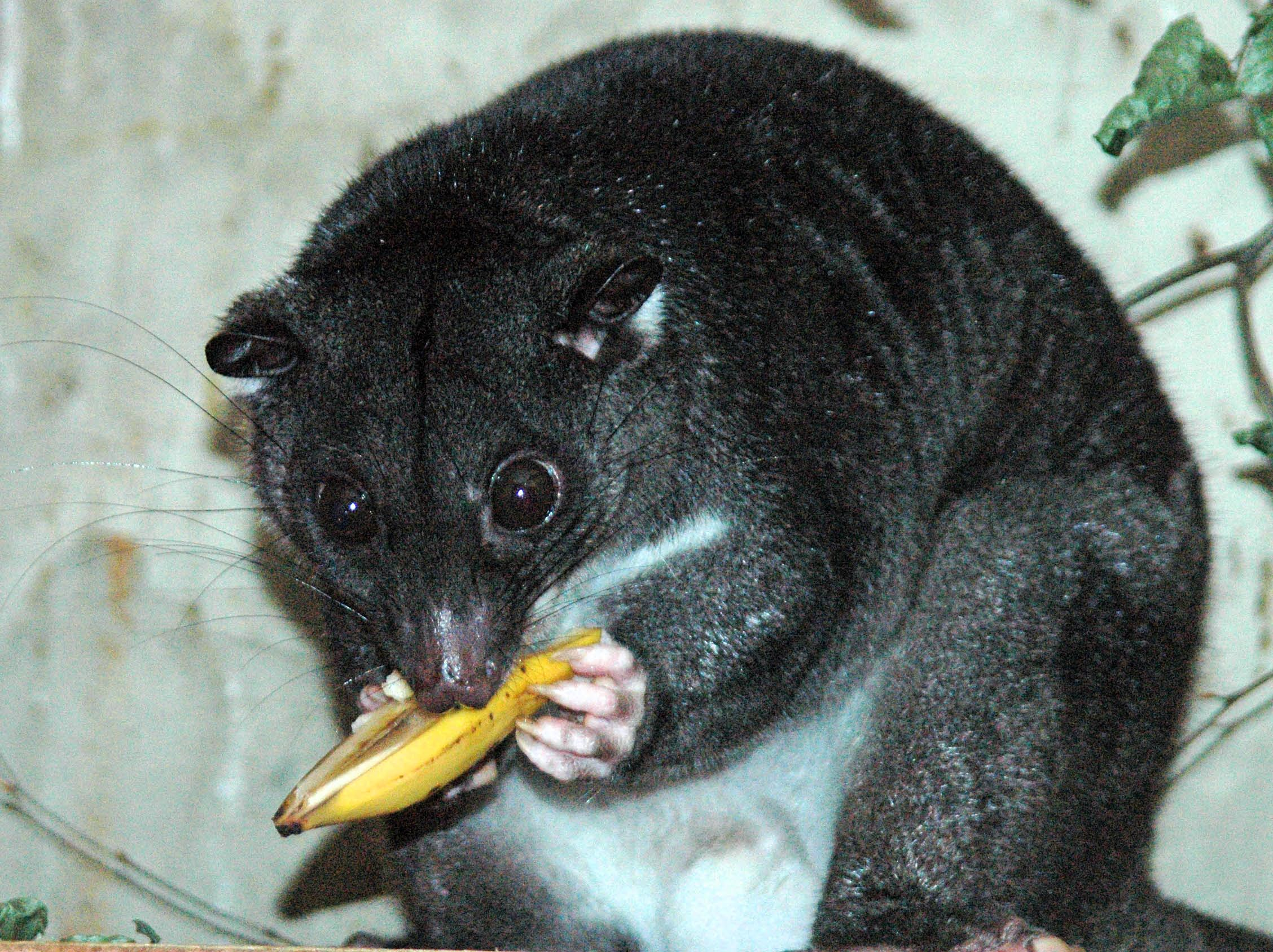
- Ground cuscus at Cotswold Wildlife Park

Conservation status
- Least Concern (IUCN 3.1)

Scientific classification
- Kingdom: Animalia
- Phylum: Chordata
- Class: Mammalia
- Infraclass: Marsupialia
- Order: Diprotodontia
- Family: Phalangeridae
- Genus: Phalanger
- Species: P. gymnotis

Binomial name
- Phalanger gymnotis (Peters & Doria, 1875)
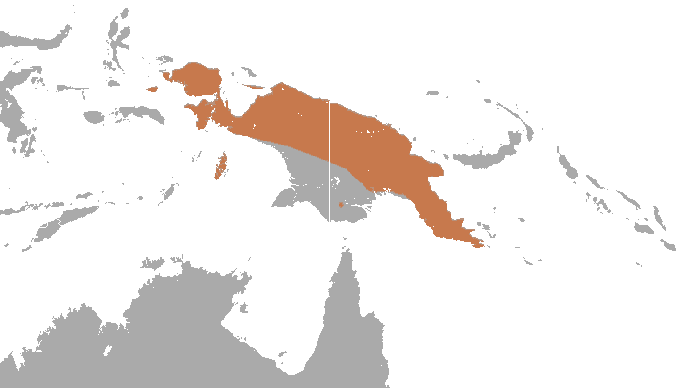
- Ground cuscus range

= Ground cuscus =

Species of marsupial

The ground cuscus (Phalanger gymnotis) is a marsupial from the order Diprotodontia and belongs within the family Phalangeridae, a diverse family consisting of the other cuscus species and the brushtail possums (Trichosurus spp.) and the scaly-tailed possum (Wyulda squamicaudata).

== Names ==
It is known as madaw, ket-ketm, or kñm in the Kalam language of Papua New Guinea.

== Description ==
Body weight of the ground cuscus averages 2.5–3.0 kg (5.5–6.6 lb). Head and body length is about 440 mm (17 in) and tail length is 330 mm (13 in) although wild populations show variation depending on their location, with individuals from lowland regions being the largest and highland animals the smallest. It has opposable thumbs on the hind feet, a prehensile tail, and a bifurcation between the second and third front digits to allow it to move easily within the trees and to feed in a suspensory position.

The pelage is short and dense and is usually some shade of grey, often with white markings on the belly and scrotum. The tail has a course, tubercle-like appearance at the base and on the dorsal side, with a ridged fingertip patterning on the underside to facilitate gripping. The feet are large with five digits, only the opposable digit on each hind foot is without claws. The ears of the ground cuscus are prominent and naked. The pouch opens forward and contains four mammae.

== Behavior ==
Cuscuses are generally arboreal folivore/frugivores, and are slow-moving and nocturnal, although hunters in New Guinea have observed them sunning themselves outside their burrows in the early morning. The tendency to nest in burrows makes this species vulnerable to hunting with dogs.

The ground cuscus differs from all other phalangerids in spending its days in burrows in the ground and appears as comfortable at ground level as in the trees. Captive specimens are often described as being mainly arboreal, whereas wild ground cuscuses are generally described as a terrestrial species. Regarded as a solitary species, the ground cuscus fights by adopting a bipedal stance and lashing out with the forelimbs whilst emitting hissing and barking vocalisations. In captivity, compatible pairs can be housed together, but periodic fighting may still occur.

== Lifespan ==
No information on longevity in the wild is available. A captive specimen was known to live for 18 years with 10 years not uncommon.

== Habitats ==
The ground cuscus is endemic to New Guinea and Aru Islands and inhabits both forests and scrubland. It is most common at elevations between 500 and 1,500 m (1,600 and 4,900 ft) but has been recorded as low as 200 m (660 ft) and as high as 2,600 m (8,500 ft). Swampy areas, deltas and floodplains are usually avoided. The ground cuscus is classified as "Least Concern" on the IUCN Red List, although it has been extirpated from parts of its original range by excessive hunting.
