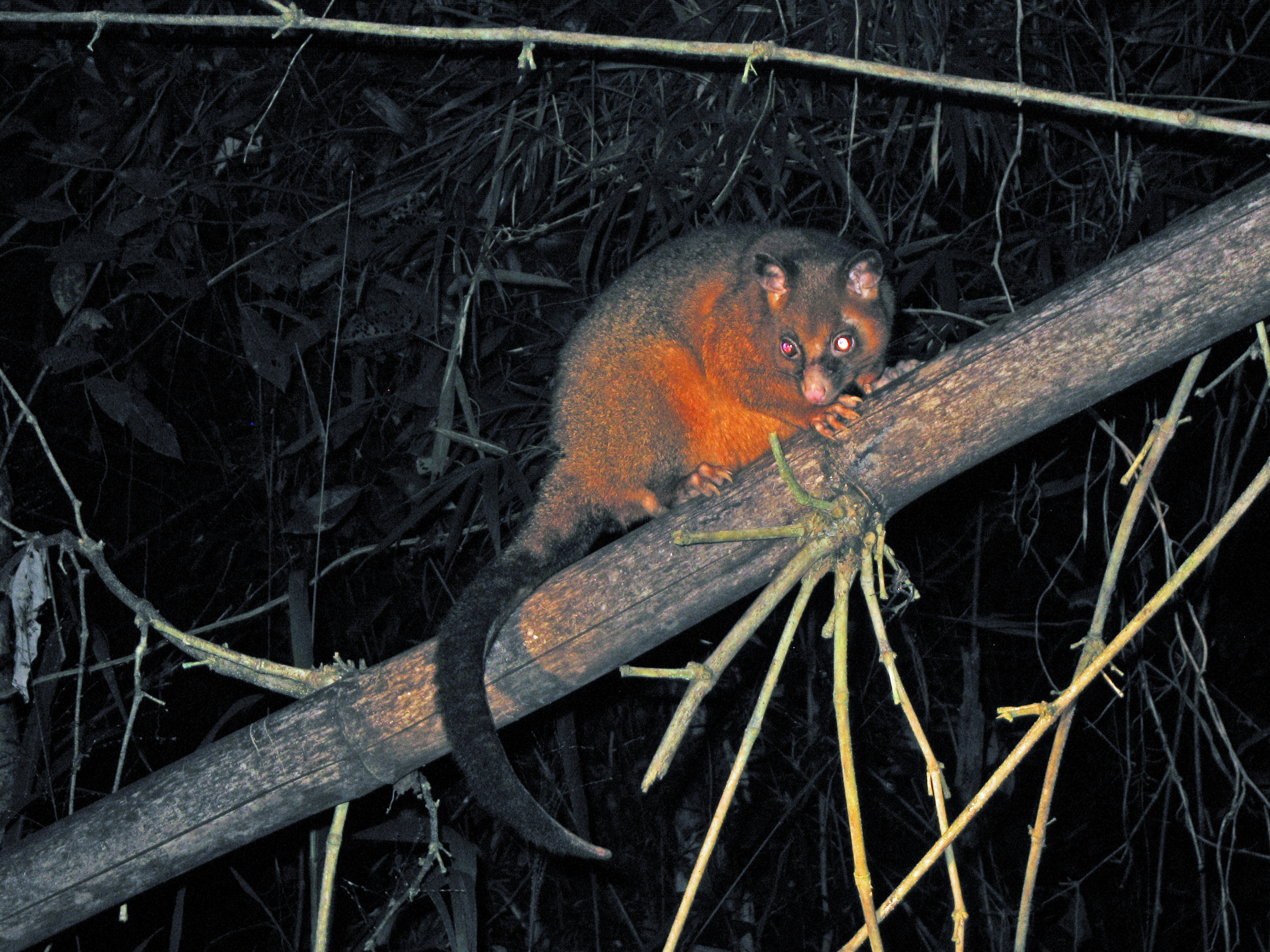

Conservation status
- Least Concern (IUCN 3.1)

Scientific classification
- Kingdom: Animalia
- Phylum: Chordata
- Class: Mammalia
- Infraclass: Marsupialia
- Order: Diprotodontia
- Family: Phalangeridae
- Genus: Trichosurus
- Species: T. johnstonii

Binomial name
- Trichosurus johnstonii (Ramsay, 1888)

= Coppery brushtail possum =

Species of marsupial

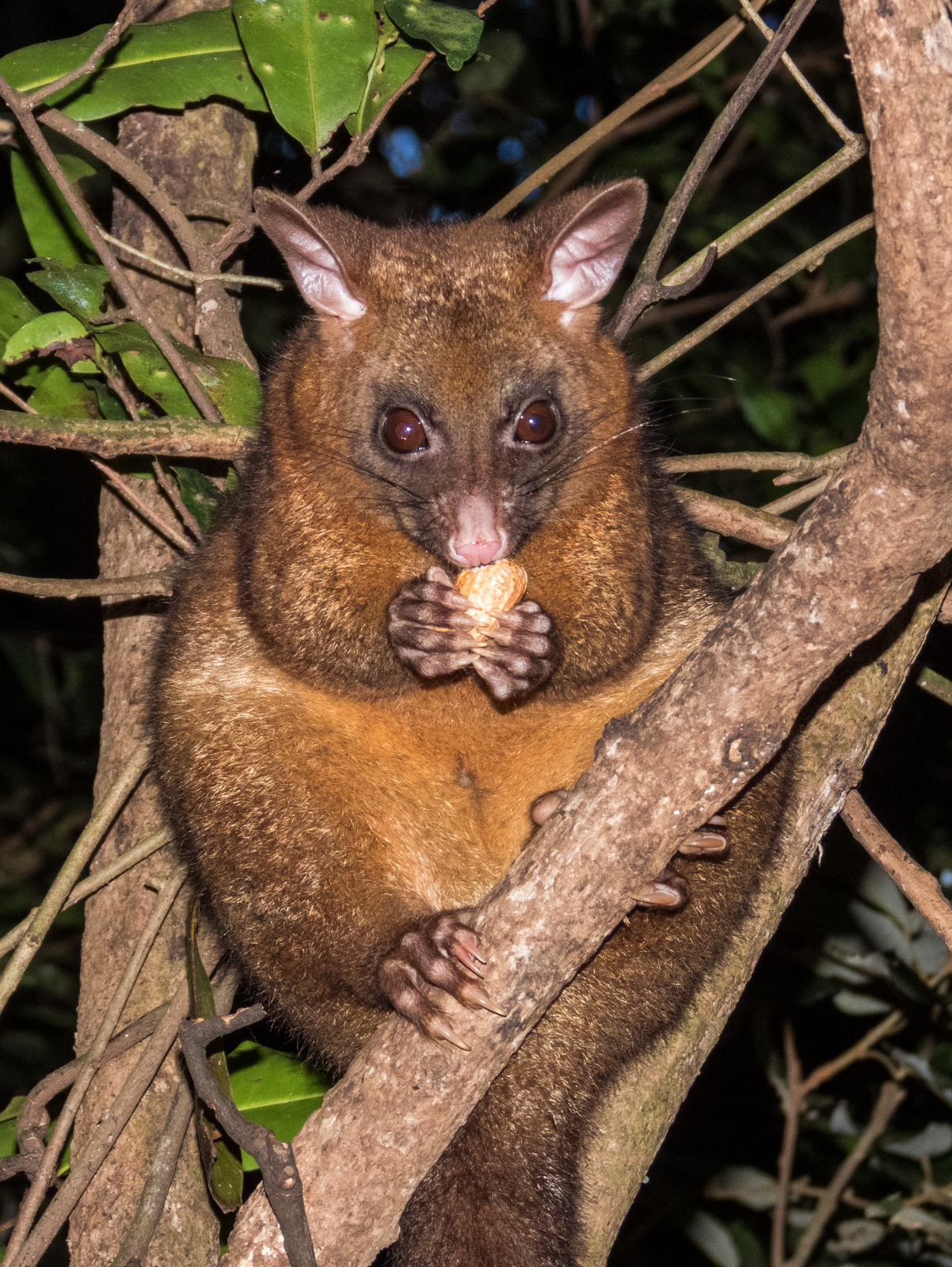
Coppery brushtail possum

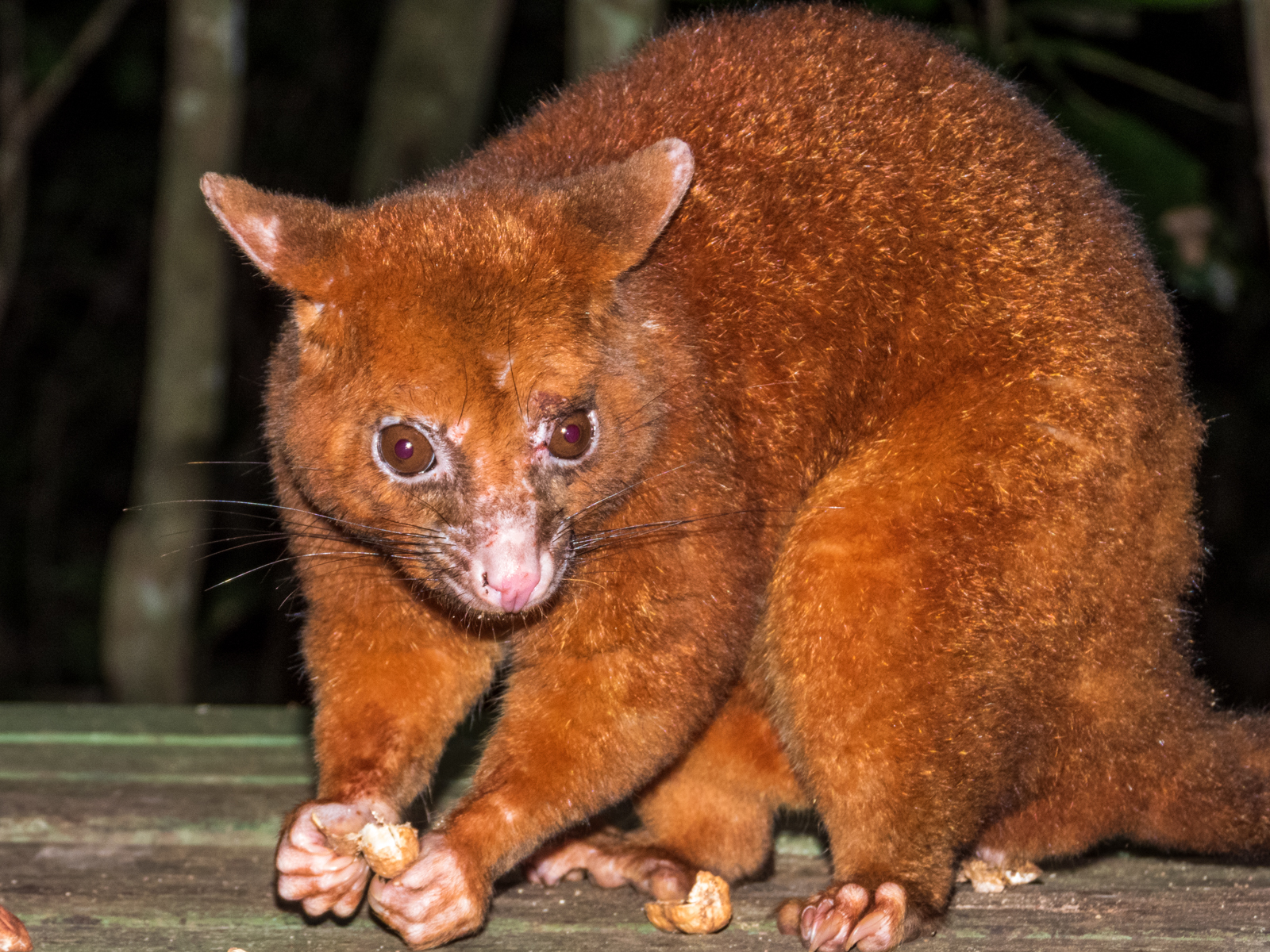
This is a subspecies of the brushtail possum and is only found in the Atherton Tablelands area of Australia.

The coppery brushtail possum (Trichosurus johnstonii) is a species of marsupial possum in the family Phalangeridae. Coppery brushtails are found within the Atherton Tablelands area of Queensland, in northeastern Australia. These mammals inhabit rainforest ecosystems, living within the tree canopy. Though they have a restricted distribution, they are locally common. This population is often considered a subspecies of T. vulpecula.

== Description ==
Coppery brushtail possums have a typical length of 40–49 cm (16–19 in) and weigh 1.2–1.8 kg (2.6–4.0 lb), with males being larger and heavier than females.

== Ecology ==
Like the common brushtail possum, coppery brushtails are nocturnal, and live in dens, which are usually tree hollows. At night, they still spend half of their time resting to conserve energy, and the other half in foraging. In feeding experiments, in selecting their food, these possums may tend to select a mix of plant materials with detoxification requirements that are correlated or independent, rather than contradictory, thus maximizing their ability to process harmful plant byproducts.

Dominance among individuals tends to place females above males, and larger over smaller individuals.
