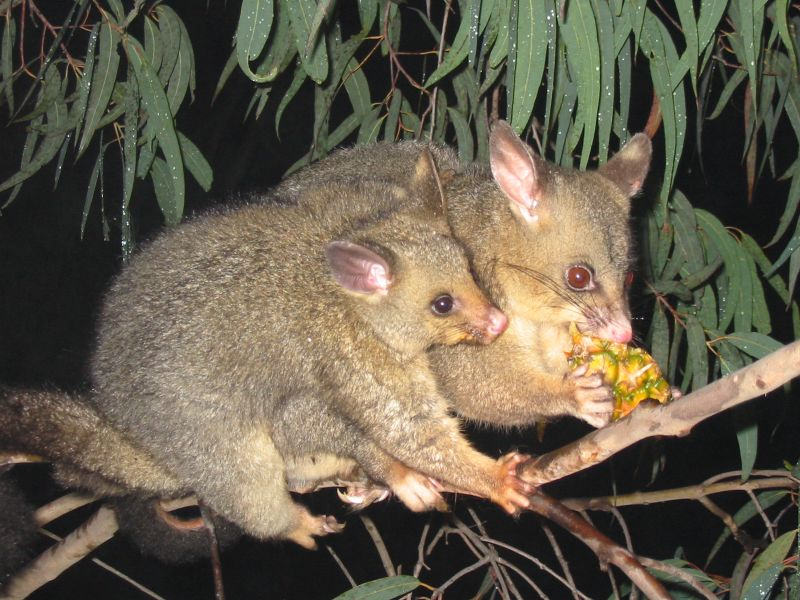
- Common brushtail possum

Scientific classification
- Kingdom: Animalia
- Phylum: Chordata
- Class: Mammalia
- Infraclass: Marsupialia
- Order: Diprotodontia
- Superfamily: Phalangeroidea
- Family: Phalangeridae; Thomas, 1888

Type genus
- Phalanger Storr, 1780

Genera
- Ailurops; †Archerus; †Eocuscus?; †Onirocuscus; Phalanger; Spilocuscus; Strigocuscus; Trichosurus; Wyulda
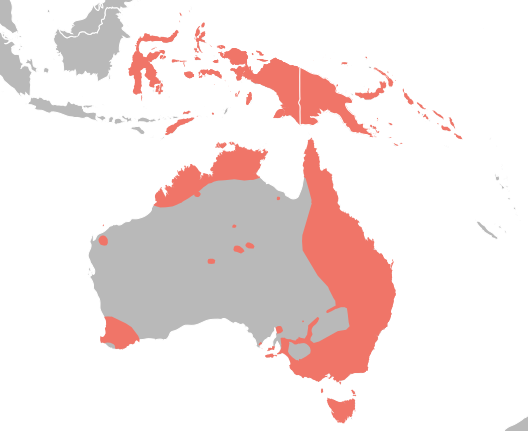
- Phalangeridae distribution

= Phalangeridae =

Family of marsupials

The Phalangeridae are a family of mostly nocturnal marsupials native to Australia, New Guinea, and Eastern Indonesia as far west as Sulawesi, including the cuscuses, brushtail possums, and their close relatives. Considered a type of possum, most species are arboreal, and they inhabit a wide range of forest habitats from alpine woodland to eucalypt forest and tropical jungle. Many species have been introduced to various non-native habitats by humans for thousands of years.

== Characteristics ==
Phalangerids are relatively large, compared with other possums. The smallest species, the Sulawesi dwarf cuscus, is cat-sized, averaging 34 cm (13 in) in length, while the largest, the black-spotted cuscus, is around 70 cm (28 in) long, and weighs 5 kg (11 lb). Besides the large size, other key features distinguishing phalangerids from other possums include the presence of bare skin on at least part of the tail, and low-crowned molar teeth. They have claws on the fore feet, but none on the hind feet, although these do have an opposable first toe to help grip onto branches. Additionally, in all but one species, both the first and second digits of the fore feet are opposable. Their fur is typically dense or woolly, and may be grey, black, or reddish-brown, often with spots or stripes.

Most phalangerids are folivores, feeding primarily on leaves. Like some similar species, they have a large cecum to ferment this highly fibrous food and extract as much nutrition as possible. Their teeth, though, are not as highly adapted to this diet as other possums, and they also eat fruit, and even some invertebrates. The only exception to these general rules is the ground cuscus, which is carnivorous, and is also less arboreal than other phalangerid species. The dental formula of phalangerids is:

Dentition
3.1.1.4
2.0.1–2.4

Gestation in phalangerids lasts 16–17 days in those species so far studied. The females have a well-developed pouch, and typically raise only one or two young at a time, less than many other possums. The adults are typically solitary, defending territories marked by scent-gland spray, odiferous saliva, urine, or dung.

Most possums conserve the functions of the epipubic bones. The exception is Trichosurus, which remarkably among marsupials has shifted the hypaxial muscles from the epipubic to the pelvis, employing a more placental-like breathing, having lost the benefits of the epipubic in regards to lung ventilation. In general, these possums are more terrestrial than other members of this group, and resemble terrestrial primates in some respects.

== Classification ==
This classification is based on Beck et al. (2022). The listing for extant species is based on The Third edition of Wilson & Reeder's Mammal Species of the World (2005), except where the Mammal Diversity Database and IUCN agree on a change.

- Incertae sedis
  - †Eocuscus?
    - †Eocuscus sarastamppi?
  - †Onirocuscus
    - †Onirocuscus inversus
    - †Onirocuscus notialis
    - †Onirocuscus reidi
    - †Onirocuscus rupina
    - †Onirocuscus silvacultrix
  - †"Trichosurus" dicksoni
- Subfamily Trichosurinae
  - †Archerus?
    - †Archerus johntoniae?
  - Trichosurus
    - Northern brushtail possum (Trichosurus arnhemensis)
    - Short-eared possum (Trichosurus caninus)
    - Mountain brushtail possum (Trichosurus cunninghami)
    - †Trichosurus hamiltonensis
    - Coppery brushtail possum (Trichosurus johnstonii)
    - Common brushtail possum (Trichosurus vulpecula)
  - Wyulda
    - †Wyulda asherjoeli
    - Scaly-tailed possum (Wyulda squamicaudata)
- Subfamily Ailuropinae
  - Ailurops
    - Talaud bear cuscus (Ailurops melanotis)
    - Sulawesi bear cuscus (Ailurops ursinus)
  - Strigocuscus
    - Sulawesi dwarf cuscus (Strigocuscus celebensis)
    - Banggai cuscus (Strigocuscus pelegensis)
- Subfamily Phalangerinae
  - Phalanger
    - Gebe cuscus (Phalanger alexandrae)
    - Mountain cuscus (Phalanger carmelitae)
    - Ground cuscus (Phalanger gymnotis)
    - Eastern common cuscus (Phalanger intercastellanus)
    - Woodlark cuscus (Phalanger lullulae)
    - Blue-eyed cuscus (Phalanger matabiru)
    - Telefomin cuscus (Phalanger matanim)
    - Southern common cuscus (Phalanger mimicus)
    - Northern common cuscus (Phalanger orientalis)
    - Ornate cuscus (Phalanger ornatus)
    - Rothschild's cuscus (Phalanger rothschildi)
    - Silky cuscus (Phalanger sericeus)
    - Stein's cuscus (Phalanger vestitus)
  - Spilocuscus
    - Admiralty Island cuscus (Spilocuscus kraemeri)
    - Common spotted cuscus (Spilocuscus maculatus)
    - Waigeou cuscus (Spilocuscus papuensis)
    - Black-spotted cuscus (Spilocuscus rufoniger)
    - Blue-eyed spotted cuscus (Spilocuscus wilsoni)

== Vernacular names ==
Blust (1982, 1993, 2002, 2009) reconstructs the form *kandoRa 'cuscus' for Proto-Central–Eastern Malayo-Polynesian (i.e., the reconstructed most recent common ancestor of the Central–Eastern Malayo-Polynesian languages), but the validity of this reconstruction is doubted by Schapper (2011).

Schapper (2011) shows that reconstructed forms for cuscus are in fact quite diverse, and cannot be reconstructed to Proto-Central–Eastern Malayo-Polynesian. Other names for cuscus are:

- Proto-Timor: *madar
- Proto-Southeast Maluku: *mander
- Proto-Central Maluku: *mansər
- Proto-Oceanic: *kadroRa; a semantic shift occurred from 'cuscus' to 'bandicoot' (Peramelidae), and from Proto-Central–Eastern Malayo-Polynesian to Proto-Oceanic for the form *mans(a,ə)r.
- Proto-South Halmahera: *do
- Proto-Aru: *wagal
- North Bomberai languages:
  - Onin: yawat
  - Sekar: kawat
  - Arguni: rawake
- Proto-North Halmahera (non-Austronesian): *kusoro

Other local names for the cuscus are:

- Central Maluku: Hila makel, Manipa marele, Wakasihu marilu, Hitu makel, Kailolo makele, Katu makello, Larike máridu, Nuaulu mara(ne)
- Timor: Kemak mada, Tetun meda, Mambae mat, Galoli madar, Waima'a meda, Uab Meto urem, Roma mada, Wetar maʧa
- Bird's Head Peninsula: Irarutu jemoga, Meoswar musiew, Ansus amu, Warembori maje
