= Madau =

Island in Papua New Guinea

Coordinates: 08°58′26″S 152°25′17″E

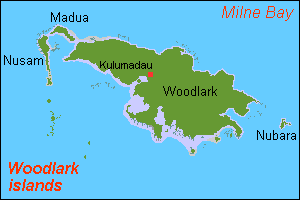
Map of Woodlark islands showing Madau island

Madau is an island of the Woodlark Islands group, in the Solomon Sea and Milne Bay Province of Papua New Guinea.

== Geography ==
It is a few hundred metres off the northwestern tip of Woodlark Island. Its area is 32 km^{2} (12 sq mi). The highest point is 7 metres (23 ft) above MSL.

At the census of population of 2000, the island had 758 inhabitants. 307 were in the principal village of Madau, located in the centre of the island; 237 in Muneiveyova in the north; and 178 in Boagis in the south. The north and south sections of the island are joined by an isthmus.

== Natural history ==
There is only one species of mammal on the island, the Woodlark Cuscus (Phalanger lullulae). It is in the Trobriand Islands rain forests ecoregion.

== See also ==
- Woodlark Islands topics
