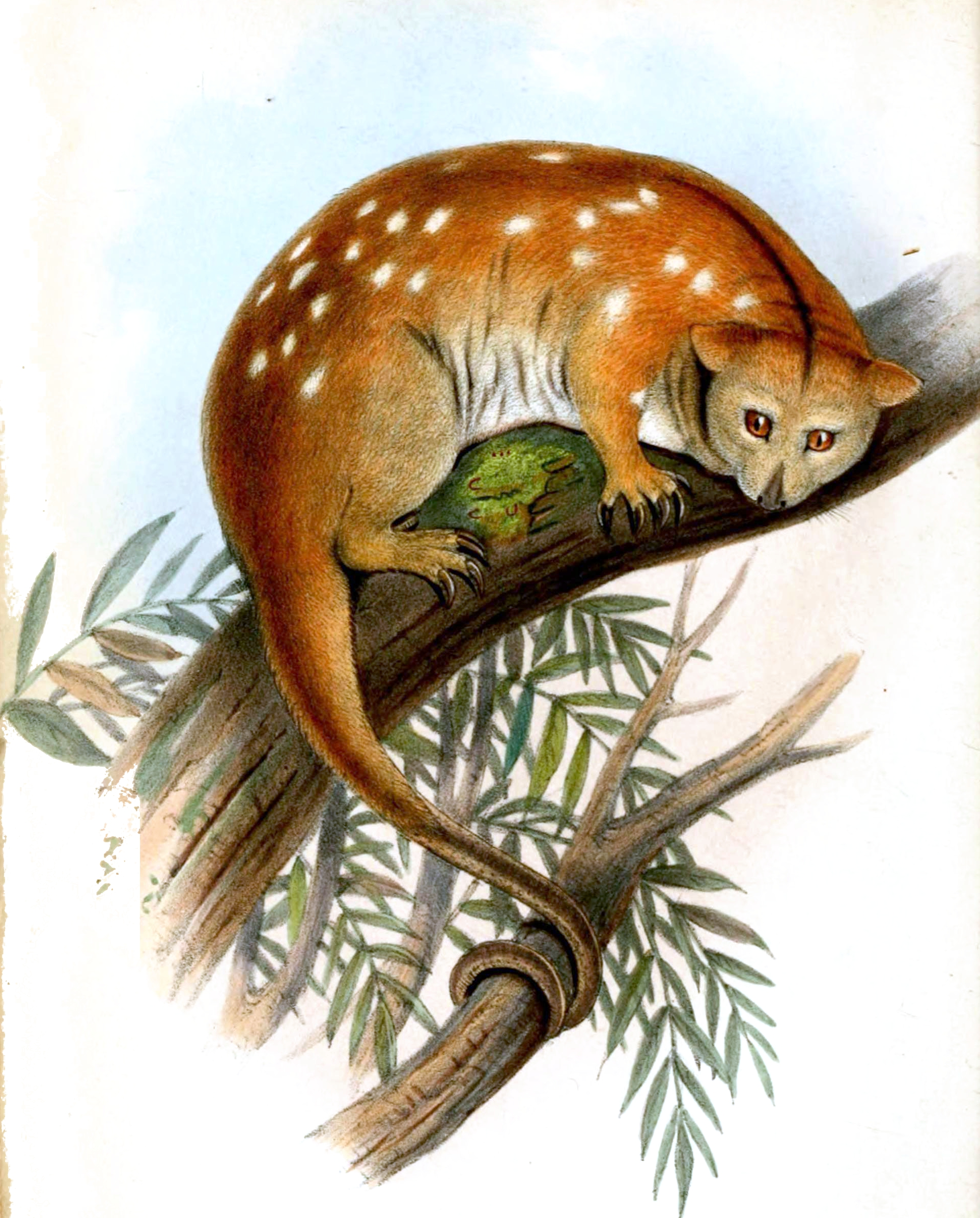

Conservation status
- Least Concern (IUCN 3.1)

Scientific classification
- Kingdom: Animalia
- Phylum: Chordata
- Class: Mammalia
- Infraclass: Marsupialia
- Order: Diprotodontia
- Family: Phalangeridae
- Genus: Phalanger
- Species: P. ornatus

Binomial name
- Phalanger ornatus (J. E. Gray, 1860)
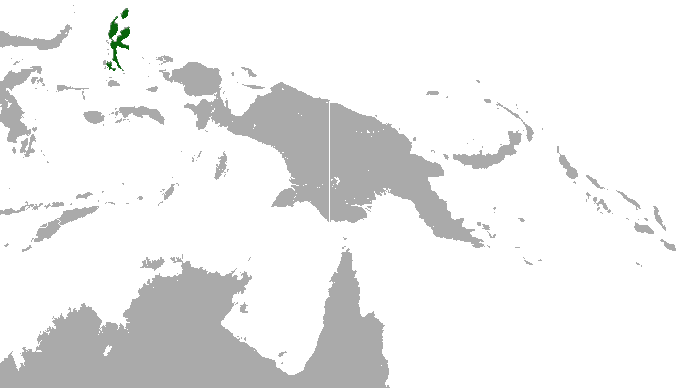
- Ornate cuscus range

= Ornate cuscus =

Species of marsupial

The ornate cuscus or Molluccan cuscus (Phalanger ornatus) is a species of marsupial in the family Phalangeridae. It is endemic to Indonesia, where it is found on the North Maluku islands of Halmahera, Bacan and Morotai, at elevations from sea level to 1,000 m (3,300 ft).
