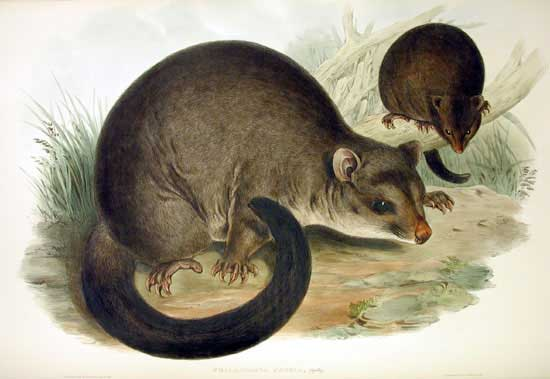

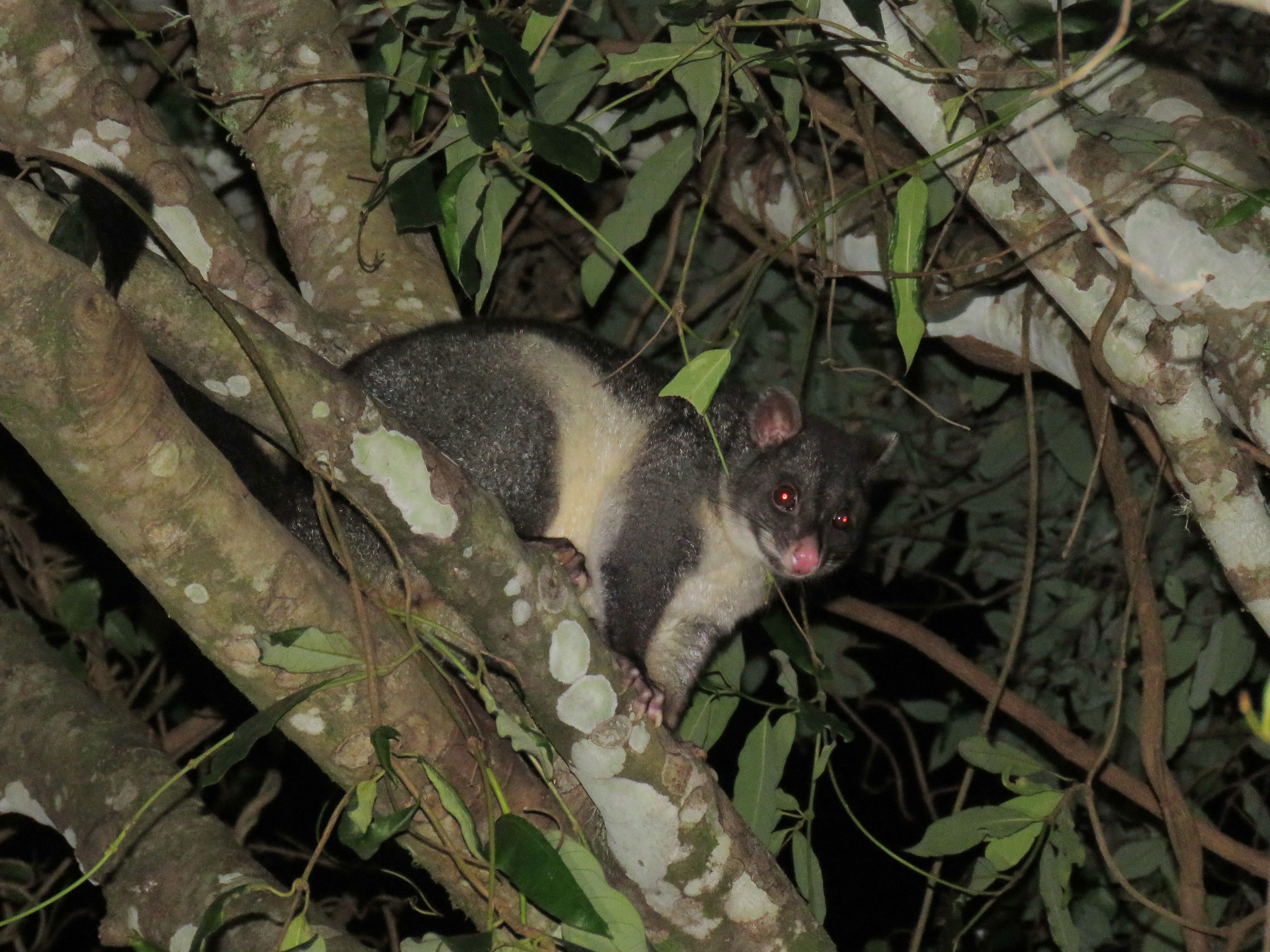

Conservation status
- Least Concern (IUCN 3.1)

Scientific classification
- Kingdom: Animalia
- Phylum: Chordata
- Class: Mammalia
- Infraclass: Marsupialia
- Order: Diprotodontia
- Family: Phalangeridae
- Genus: Trichosurus
- Species: T. caninus

Binomial name
- Trichosurus caninus (Ogilby, 1836)
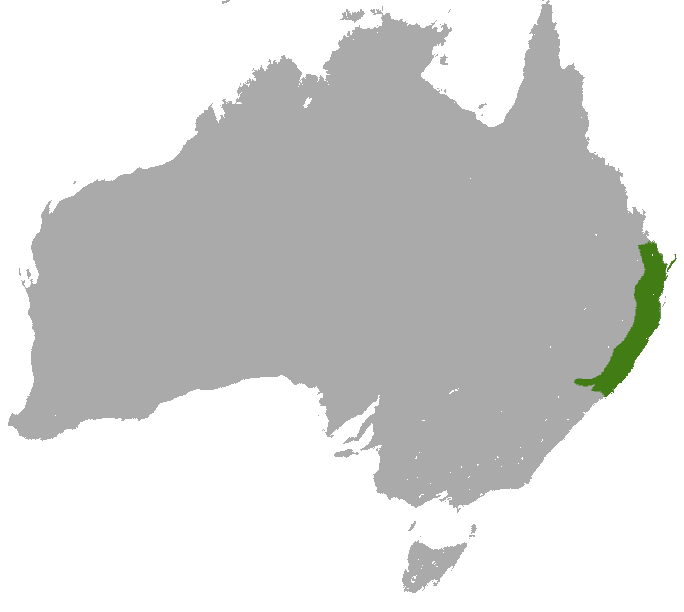
- Short-eared possum range

= Short-eared possum =

Species of marsupial

The short-eared possum (Trichosurus caninus) is a species of marsupial in the family Phalangeridae, endemic to Australia. Found north of Sydney, New South Wales, on Australia's eastern coast, the species was once classed under the mountain brushtail possum, its closest relative.

In the wild, they can live for up to 17 years (possibly longer in captivity), maintain a stable territory, and invest significant energy and time rearing their young.

Short-eared possums are most commonly found along the southeastern coast of the Australian continent, where they reside in wet rainforests and humid, dense thickets.
