= Gebe cuscus =

Conservation status
- Endangered (IUCN 3.1)

Scientific classification
- Kingdom: Animalia
- Phylum: Chordata
- Class: Mammalia
- Infraclass: Marsupialia
- Order: Diprotodontia
- Family: Phalangeridae
- Genus: Phalanger
- Species: P. alexandrae

Binomial name
- Phalanger alexandrae Flannery & Boeadi, 1995
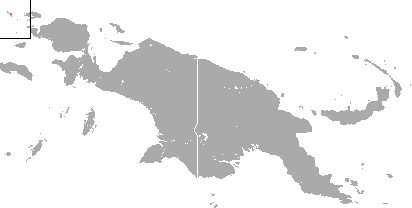
- Gebe cuscus range

Species of marsupial

The Gebe cuscus (Phalanger alexandrae) is a species of marsupial in the family Phalangeridae. It is endemic to the island of Gebe, North Maluku province, Indonesia, where it lives at elevations from sea level to 300 m.

It is named after the Australian anthropologist Alexandra Szalay.
