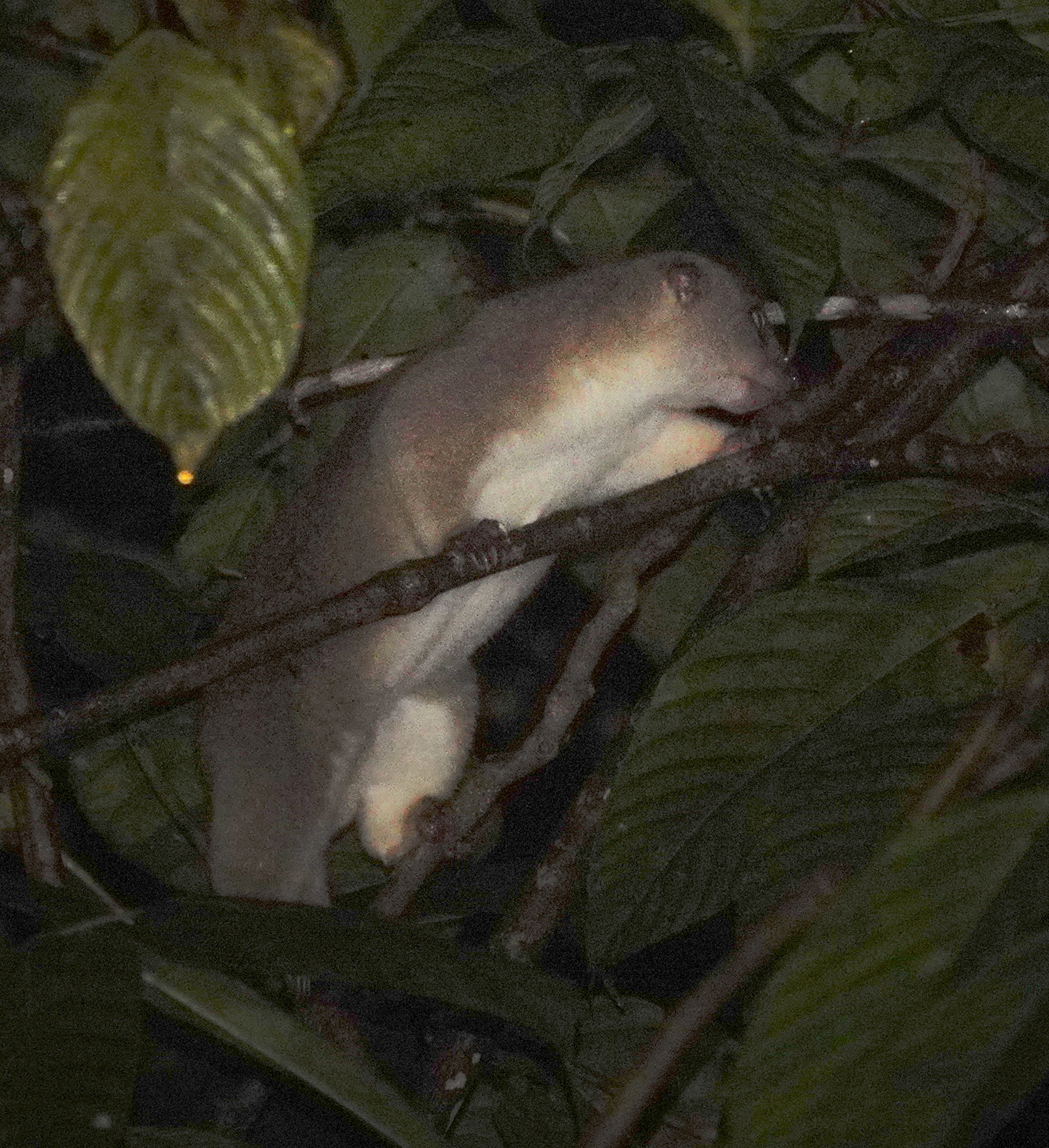

Conservation status
- Least Concern (IUCN 3.1)

Scientific classification
- Kingdom: Animalia
- Phylum: Chordata
- Class: Mammalia
- Infraclass: Marsupialia
- Order: Diprotodontia
- Family: Phalangeridae
- Genus: Phalanger
- Species: P. rothschildi

Binomial name
- Phalanger rothschildi Thomas, 1898
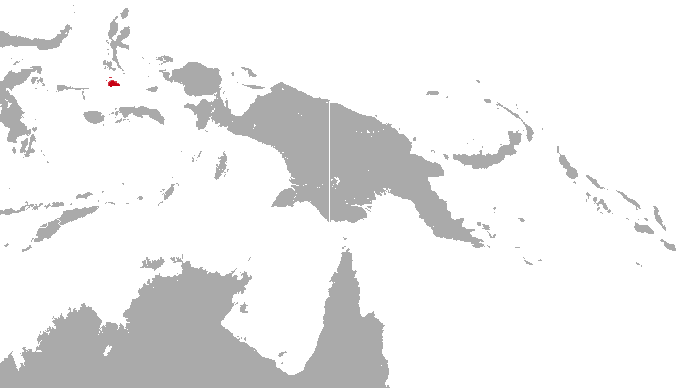
- Rothschild's cuscus range

= Rothschild's cuscus =

Species of marsupial

Rothschild's cuscus (Phalanger rothschildi), also called the Obi Island cuscus, is a species of marsupial in the family Phalangeridae. It is endemic to the islands of Obi, Bisa and Obilatu in the Obi Islands of Maluku province, Indonesia.
