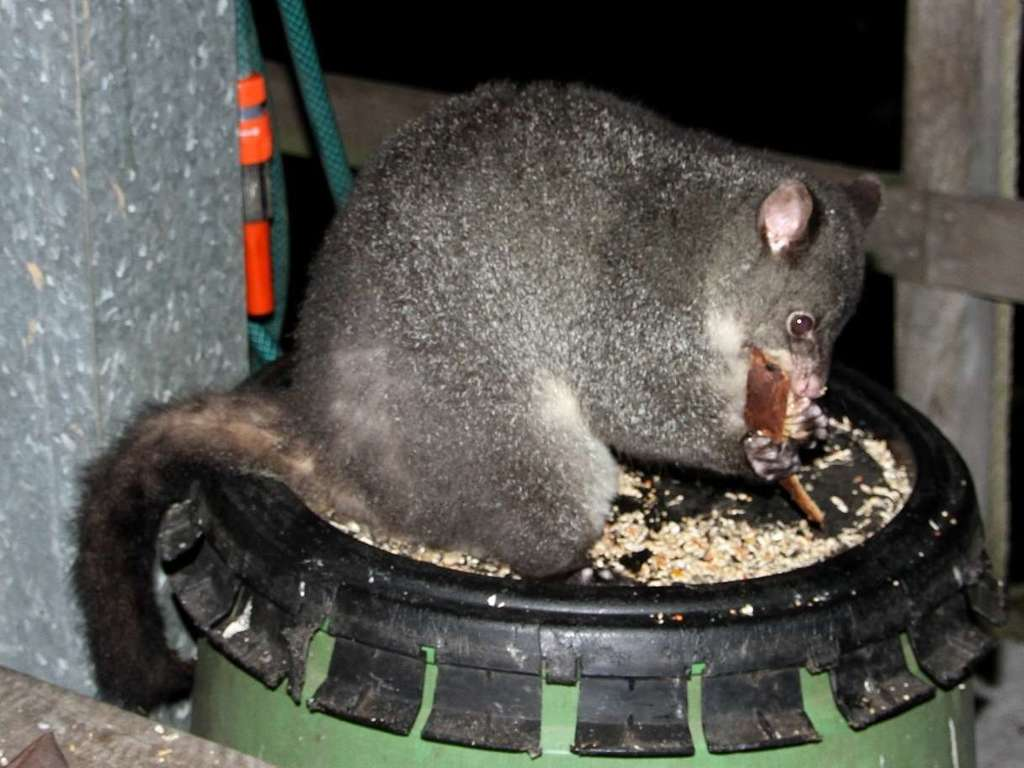

Conservation status
- Least Concern (IUCN 3.1)

Scientific classification
- Kingdom: Animalia
- Phylum: Chordata
- Class: Mammalia
- Infraclass: Marsupialia
- Order: Diprotodontia
- Family: Phalangeridae
- Genus: Trichosurus
- Species: T. cunninghami

Binomial name
- Trichosurus cunninghami Lindenmayer, Dubach and Viggers, 2002
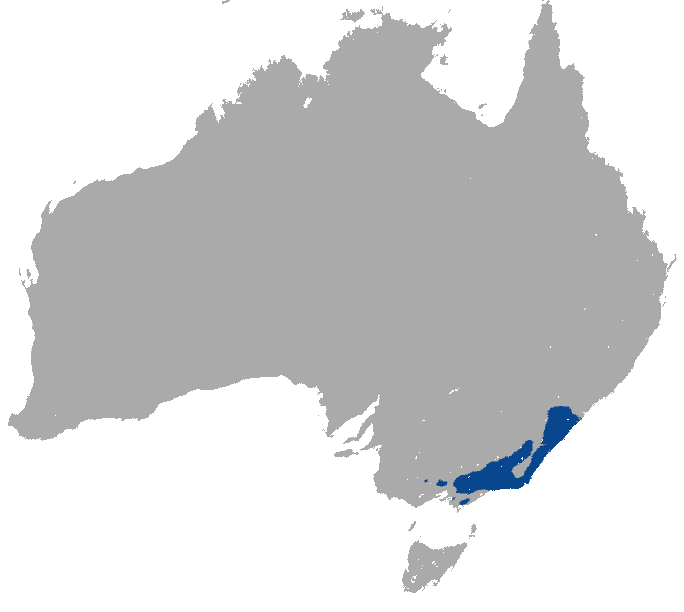
- Mountain brushtail possum range

= Mountain brushtail possum =

Species of marsupial

The mountain brushtail possum, or southern bobuck (Trichosurus cunninghami), is a nocturnal, semi-arboreal marsupial of the family Phalangeridae native to southeastern Australia. It was not described as a separate species until 2002.

== Taxonomy ==
In 2002, based upon morphometric differences, the mountain brushtail possum, Trichosurus caninus, was proposed to be reclassified into two distinct species. The northern form was to retain the binomial name T. caninus, but was henceforth to be known as the short-eared possum. The southern population, prevalent in the Victorian Alps, was to retain its already designated common name mountain brushtail possum, but assigned a new binomial, T. cunninghami. However, genetic divergence between T. caninus and the putative T. cunninghami may not support a case for the establishment of a new species.

In 2005, a colony of bobucks was discovered in swamp coastal habitat in south-west Gippsland, Victoria. A follow-up biodiversity survey uncovered a widespread yet previously unrecorded population of bobucks in coastal habitat and parts of inland Gippsland.

In view of these findings, the currently accepted name, "mountain" brushtail possum, is no longer accurately descriptive. One suggestion is to rename the northern group as the "northern bobuck" and the Victorian animals as "southern bobuck", T. cunninghami.

== Description ==
Both the mountain brushtail possum, T. cunninghami, and its cousin the short-eared possum, T. caninus, are generally reported to inhabit wet sclerophyll forest in south-eastern Australia along and to the south and east of the Great Dividing Range of eastern Australia from southern Victoria to south-eastern Queensland. They typically dwell at altitudes greater than 300 metres (980 ft). Bobucks are medium-sized (2.5–4.5 kg or 5.5–9.9 lb), semi-arboreal, nocturnal marsupials.

== Diet and habitat ==
Habitat and dietary requirements of both the mountain brushtail possum and the short-eared possum are reported to be more specialised than those of their close relative the common brushtail possum, T. vulpecula. As a result, the common brushtail possum has been able to colonise a greater variety of habitats than either of its bobuck relatives. For example, unlike common brushtails, bobucks are not known in urban areas and have been thought of as being obligately adapted to stable forest environments.

During the day, the mountain brushtail possum dens in tree hollows (or sometimes in dense ground cover) and at night emerges to forage. In mountain country the mountain brushtail possum is reported to depend mainly upon Acacia species for its diet and in particular the silver wattle, Acacia dealbata. However, in lowland Gippsland there is no association of these animals with any particular type of vegetation: it is to be found in a variety of Eucalypt species stands or the Tea Tree. The mountain brushtail possum is known to feed at ground level and they are able to utilise hypogeal and epigeal fungi as well as ground-level plants food resources.

The mountain brushtail possum is also reported to require tree hollows for use as dens. Indeed, both the easy availability of hollow-bearing trees and silver wattle are thought to determine the population density and distribution of the mountain brushtail possum in Victoria.

== Reproduction ==
The mountain brushtail possum shows little sexual dimorphism. Mating occurs within a 2–3 week period during autumn (March–June). Female oestrus is highly synchronised, and most females will give birth to one offspring each year. Males do not appear to provide any care to the young. The young emerge from the pouch after several months and are then carried on the back of their mother. Over the summer (December to February), young begin to accompany their mothers on foot as a first step, as it were, to full independence. Neither males nor females will reproduce until they are at least two years of age. There is evidence that female offspring are often philopatric while young males have been found to disperse up to 8 km (5 mi). Upon reaching reproductive maturity, the mountain brushtail possum will retain the same home range for life.

Its longevity is amazingly high: in fact it is perhaps the longest lived marsupial species.

Recent research indicates that the mating system of the mountain brushtail possum is variable. Intensive study of two mountain brushtail possum populations found that one of these populations was polygynous, while the other was monogamous. The two populations lived within 2 km of each other, yet the group dwelt in a linear habitat strip along a roadside that had escaped logging for over 100 years, whereas the monogamous population inhabited a forest patch that had been logged 40 years ago. To date it remains unclear whether this difference in mating system is because of the geographical shape of the habitat or the quality of its resources.
