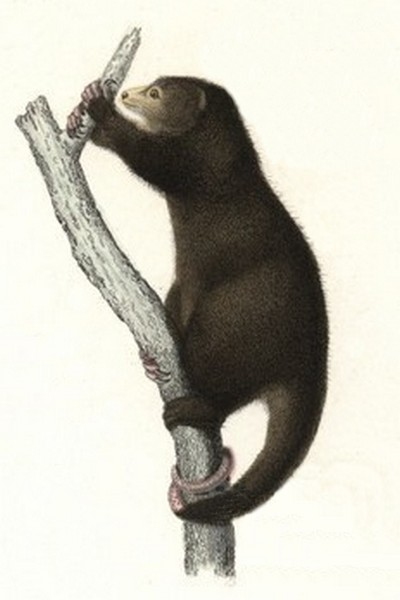

Conservation status
- Critically Endangered (IUCN 3.1)

Scientific classification
- Kingdom: Animalia
- Phylum: Chordata
- Class: Mammalia
- Infraclass: Marsupialia
- Order: Diprotodontia
- Family: Phalangeridae
- Genus: Ailurops
- Species: A. melanotis

Binomial name
- Ailurops melanotis (Thomas, 1898)
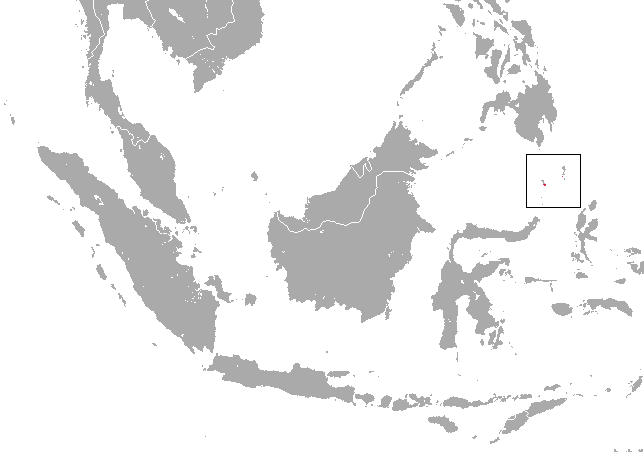
- Talaud bear cuscus range

= Talaud bear cuscus =

Species of marsupial

The Talaud bear cuscus (Ailurops melanotis) is a species of marsupial in the family Phalangeridae. It is endemic to Salibabu Island in the Talaud Islands, Indonesia. Its natural habitat is subtropical or tropical dry forests. The species is considered Critically Endangered, with a small population size and heavy hunting pressure on both islands where it occurs, as well as continued habitat degradation.

When alarmed, the Talaud bear cuscus emits a strong musk odour.
