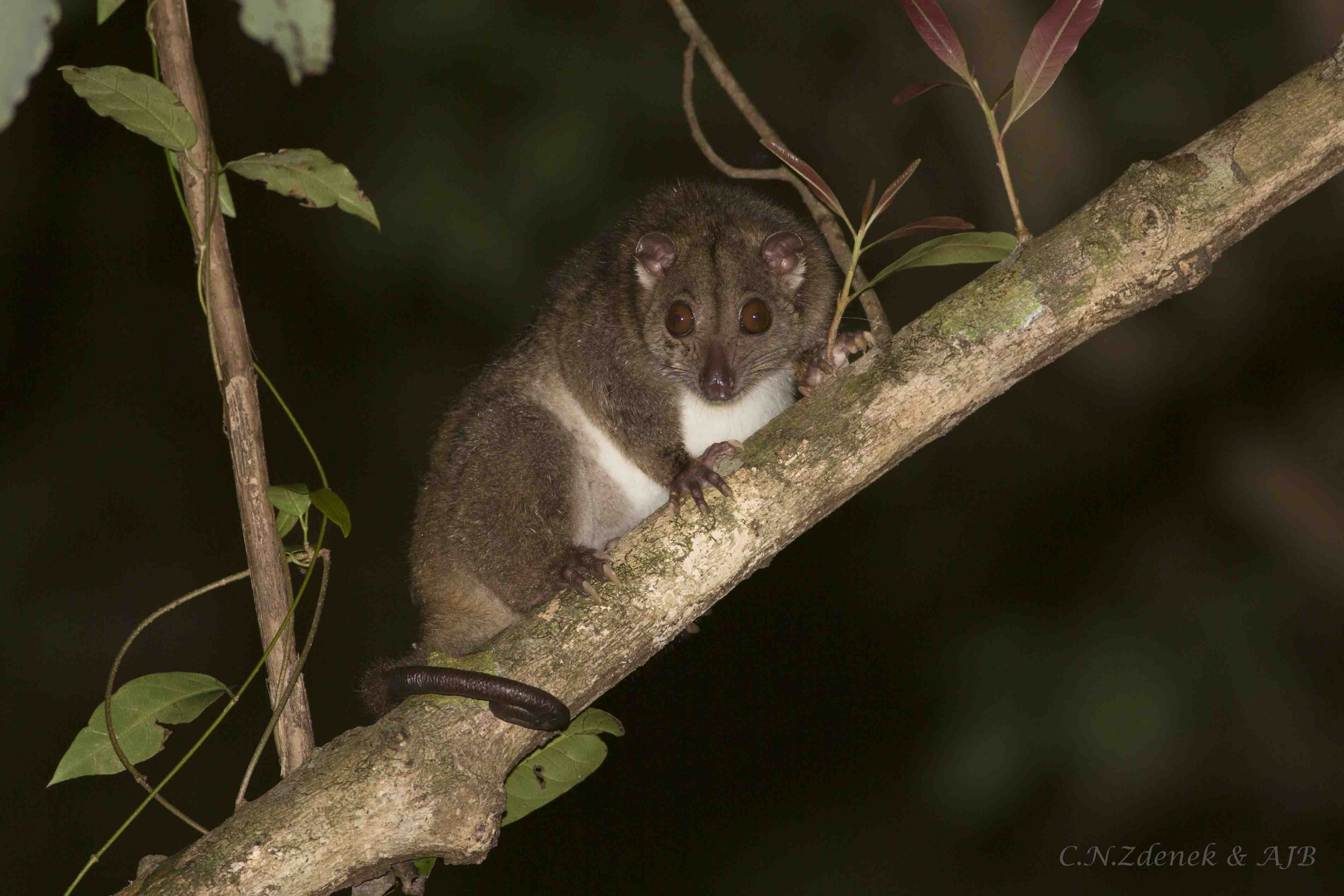

Conservation status
- Least Concern (IUCN 3.1)
- CITES Appendix II

Scientific classification
- Kingdom: Animalia
- Phylum: Chordata
- Class: Mammalia
- Infraclass: Marsupialia
- Order: Diprotodontia
- Family: Phalangeridae
- Genus: Phalanger
- Species: P. mimicus

Binomial name
- Phalanger mimicus Thomas, 1922
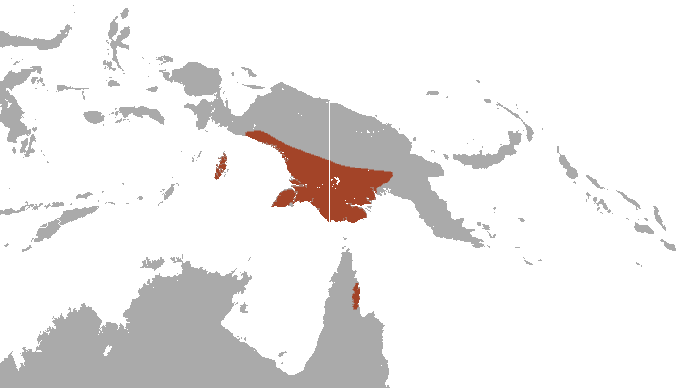
- Southern common cuscus range

= Southern common cuscus =

Species of marsupial

The southern common cuscus (Phalanger mimicus), also known as Australian cuscus, gray phalanger, and to-ili, is an arboreal marsupial endemic to Australia (Cape York), southern New Guinea and possibly the Aru Islands. Until recently, it was considered conspecific with P. intercastellanus, and before that also with P. orientalis.
