= Blue-eyed cuscus =

Conservation status
- Vulnerable (IUCN 3.1)

Scientific classification
- Kingdom: Animalia
- Phylum: Chordata
- Class: Mammalia
- Infraclass: Marsupialia
- Order: Diprotodontia
- Family: Phalangeridae
- Genus: Phalanger
- Species: P. matabiru

Binomial name
- Phalanger matabiru Flannery & Boeadi, 1995
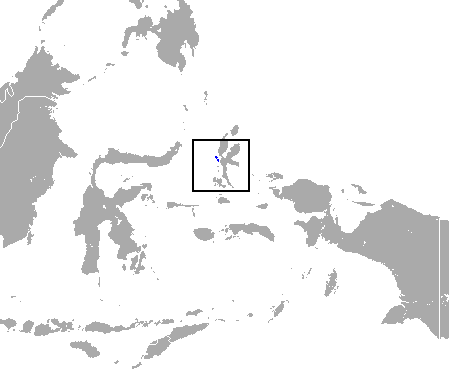
- Blue-eyed cuscus range

Species of marsupial

Blue-eyed Cuscus, Halmahera

The blue-eyed cuscus (Phalanger matabiru) is a species of marsupial in the family Phalangeridae. It is endemic to the two small islands of Ternate and Tidore, west of the island of Halmahera in North Maluku province, Indonesia.
