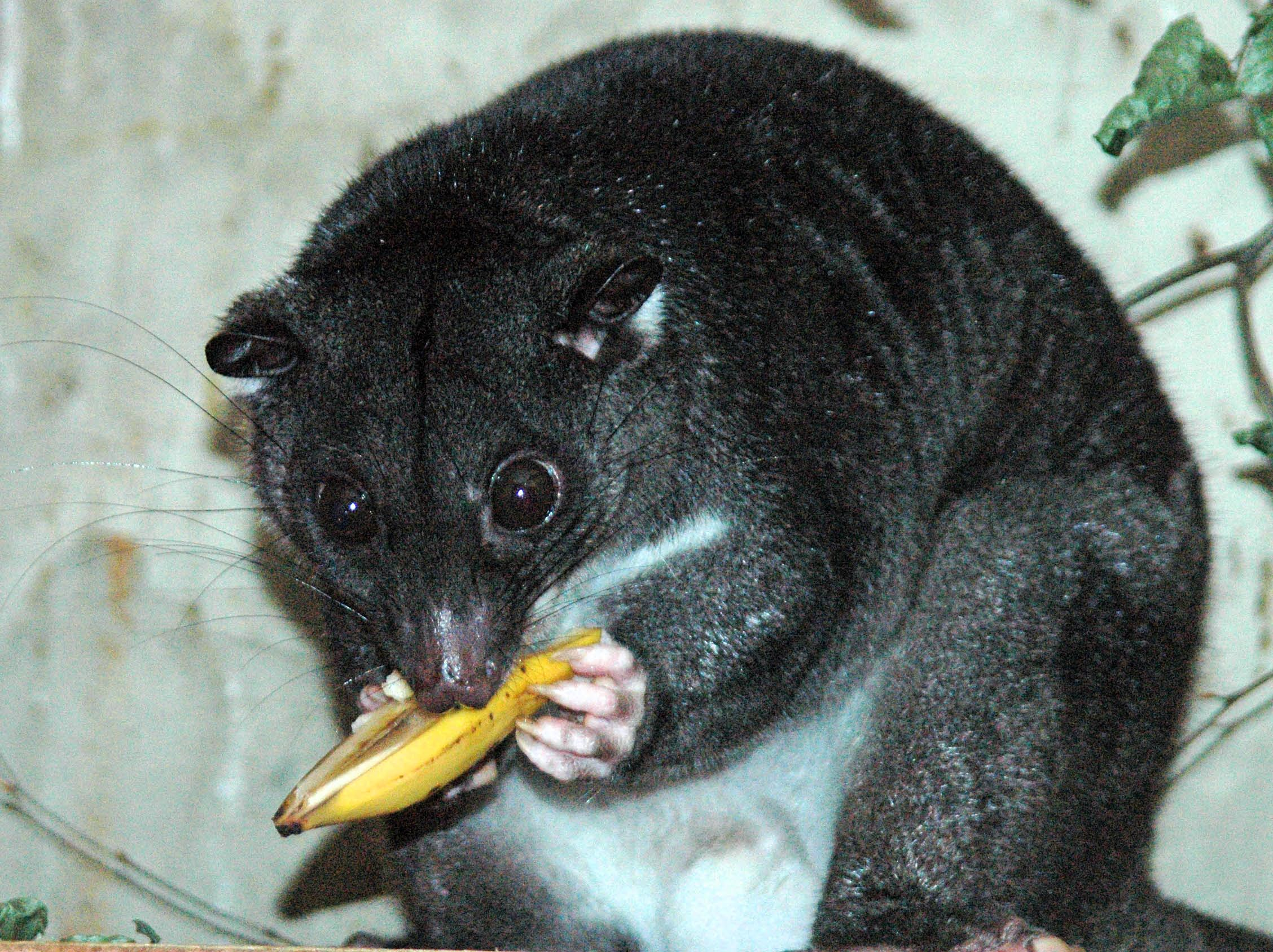
- Phalanger gymnotis at Cotswold Wildlife Park

Scientific classification
- Kingdom: Animalia
- Phylum: Chordata
- Class: Mammalia
- Infraclass: Marsupialia
- Order: Diprotodontia
- Family: Phalangeridae
- Subfamily: Phalangerinae
- Tribe: Phalangerini
- Genus: Phalanger; Storr, 1780

Type species
- Didelphis orientalis Pallas, 1766

Species
- 13, see text

= Phalanger =

Genus of mammals

Phalanger (from the Greek phalangion, meaning spider's web, from their webbed (fused) toes) is a genus of possums. Its members are found on New Guinea, the Maluku Islands, other nearby small islands, and Australia's Cape York Peninsula. They are marsupials of the family Phalangeridae, and are one of the four genera whose species are commonly referred to as cuscuses.

- Genus Phalanger
  - Gebe cuscus, P. alexandrae
  - Mountain cuscus, P. carmelitae
  - Ground cuscus, P. gymnotis
  - Eastern common cuscus, P. intercastellanus
  - Woodlark cuscus, P. lullulae
  - Blue-eyed cuscus, P. matabiru
  - Telefomin cuscus, P. matanim
  - Southern common cuscus, P. mimicus
  - Northern common cuscus, P. orientalis
  - Ornate cuscus, P. ornatus
  - Rothschild's cuscus, P. rothschildi
  - Silky cuscus, P. sericeus
  - Stein's cuscus, P. vestitus
