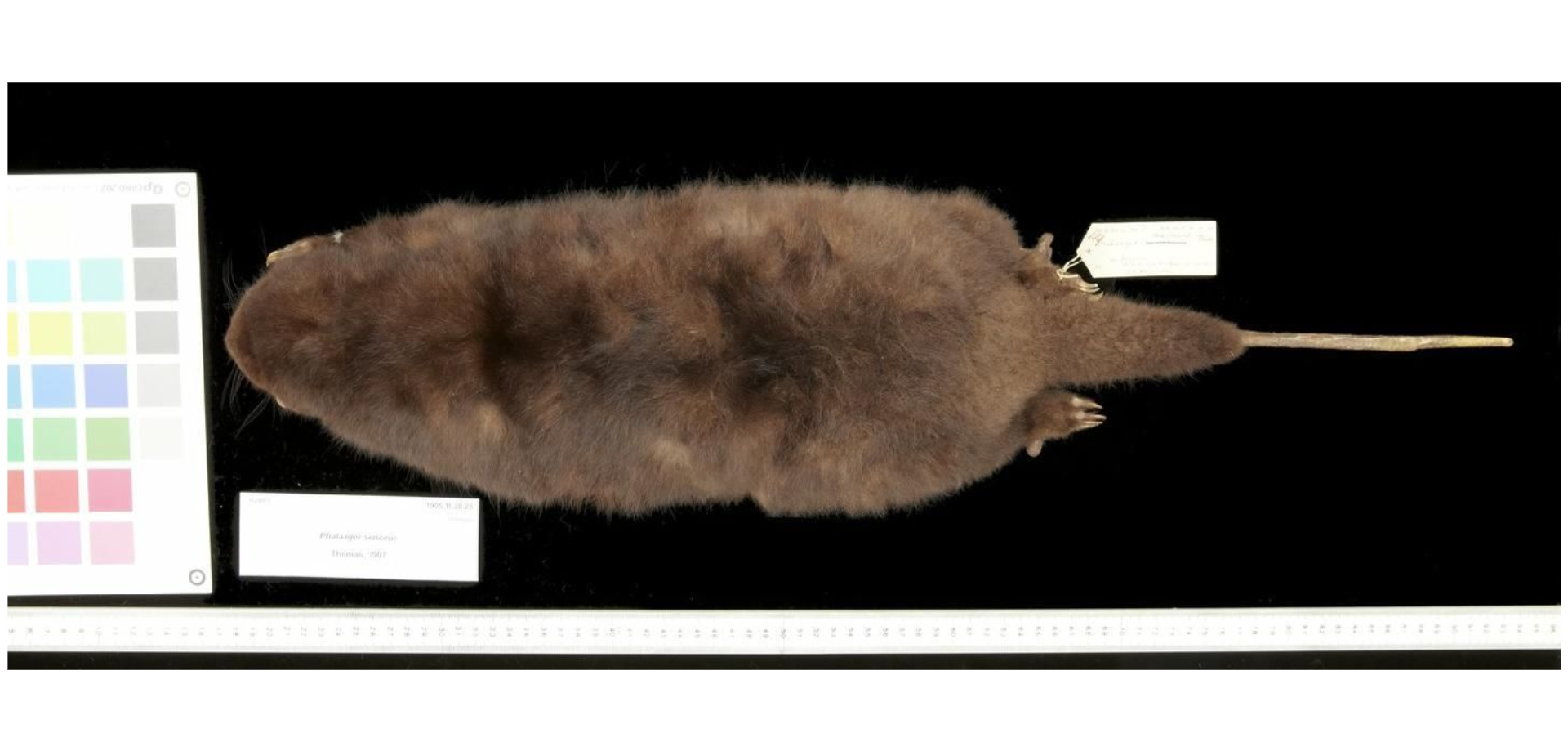

Conservation status
- Least Concern (IUCN 3.1)

Scientific classification
- Kingdom: Animalia
- Phylum: Chordata
- Class: Mammalia
- Infraclass: Marsupialia
- Order: Diprotodontia
- Family: Phalangeridae
- Genus: Phalanger
- Species: P. sericeus

Binomial name
- Phalanger sericeus Thomas, 1907
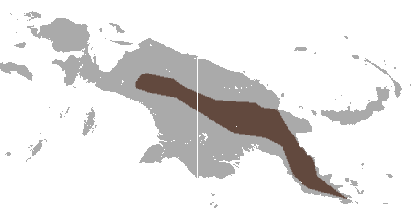
- Silky cuscus range

= Silky cuscus =

Species of marsupial

The silky cuscus (Phalanger sericeus) is a species of marsupial in the family Phalangeridae. It is found in Indonesia and Papua New Guinea.

== Names ==
It is known as atwak, añ, sosus, or beŋ-tud in the Kalam language of Papua New Guinea.

== Habitat ==
The silky cuscus is found in abundance across high elevations in the central mountains of the island of New Guinea, Indonesia, and Papua New Guinea.
