= Eastern common cuscus =

Conservation status
- Least Concern (IUCN 3.1)
- CITES Appendix II (CITES)

Scientific classification
- Kingdom: Animalia
- Phylum: Chordata
- Class: Mammalia
- Infraclass: Marsupialia
- Order: Diprotodontia
- Family: Phalangeridae
- Genus: Phalanger
- Species: P. intercastellanus

Binomial name
- Phalanger intercastellanus Thomas, 1895
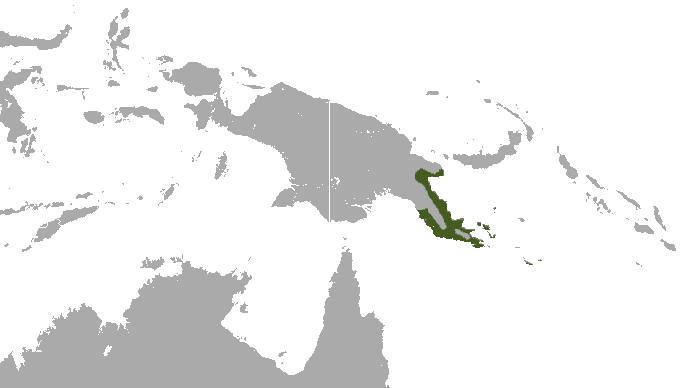
- Eastern common cuscus range

Species of marsupial

The eastern common cuscus (Phalanger intercastellanus) is a species of marsupial in the family Phalangeridae found in eastern Papua New Guinea. Until recently, it was considered conspecific with P. mimicus, and before that also with P. orientalis.

The eastern common cuscus was introduced by humans into the Aru Islands and parts of northern Australia.
