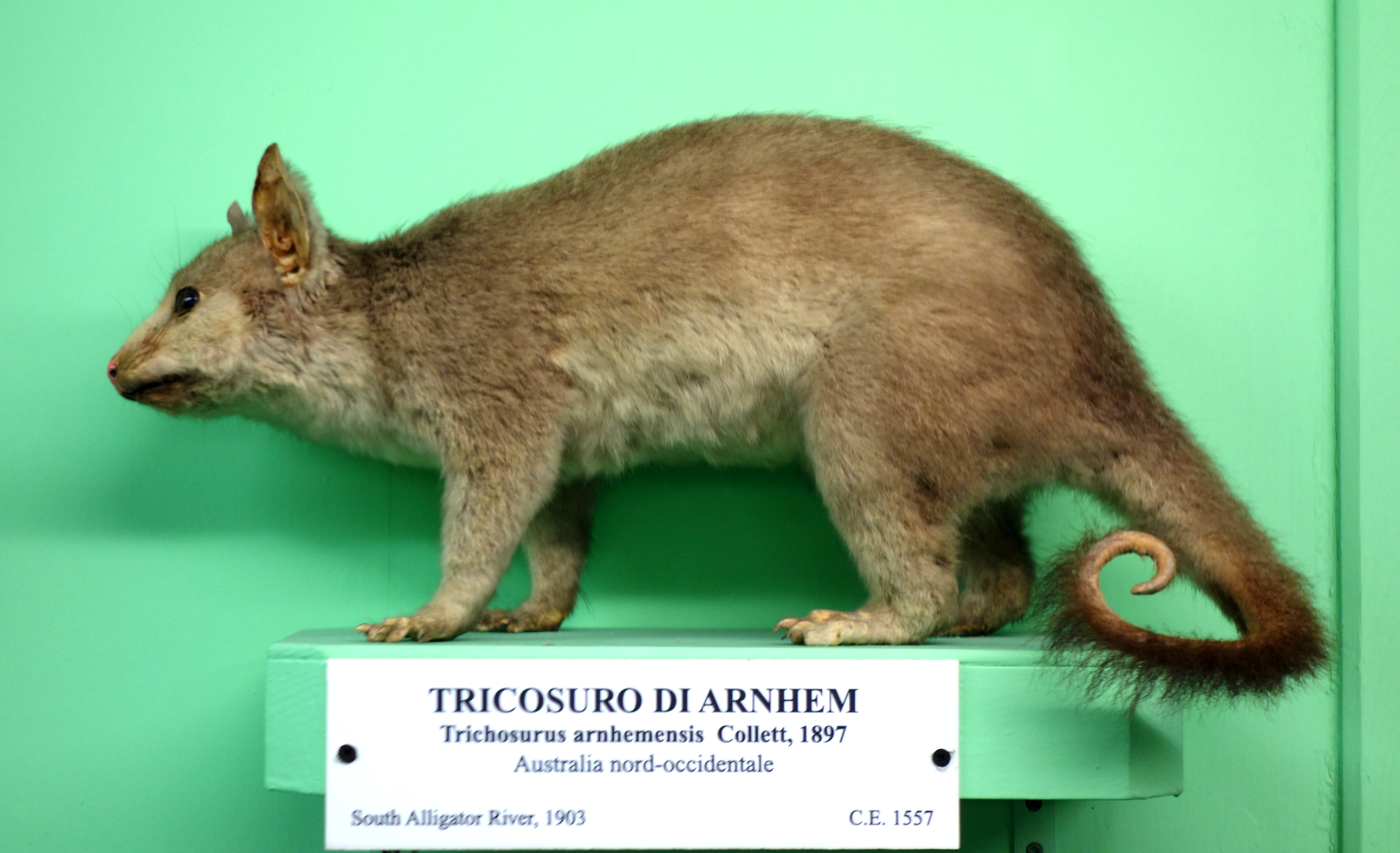
- Trichosurus arnhemensis

Scientific classification
- Kingdom: Animalia
- Phylum: Chordata
- Class: Mammalia
- Infraclass: Marsupialia
- Order: Diprotodontia
- Family: Phalangeridae
- Genus: Trichosurus
- Species: T. arnhemensis

Binomial name
- Trichosurus arnhemensis Collett, 1897

= Northern brushtail possum =

Species of marsupial

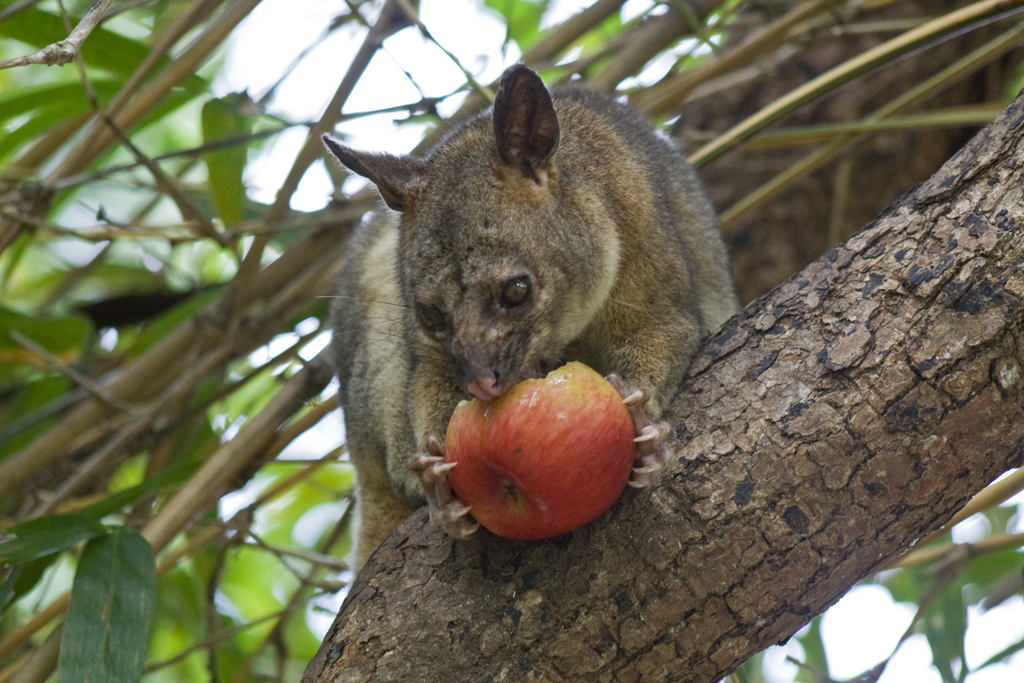
A male northern brushtail possum eating an apple

The northern brushtail possum (Trichosurus arnhemensis) is a nocturnal marsupial inhabiting northern Australia. The northern brushtail possum is sometimes considered a species; however, more often than not is considered a subspecies of the common brushtail possum (Trichosurus vulpecula arnhemensis).

== Lifestyle ==
Possums are nocturnal in nature, so feed between dawn and dusk. They are territorial creatures and can be found alone or in family groups.

== Appearance ==
Its fur is a grey in colour, with a white underbelly and pink skin. The northern brushtail possum can grow up to 55 cm (22 in) in length, not including its tail, and is around the size of a small cat. Unlike its relatives and despite what its name suggests, the northern brushtail possum does not have a bushy tail.

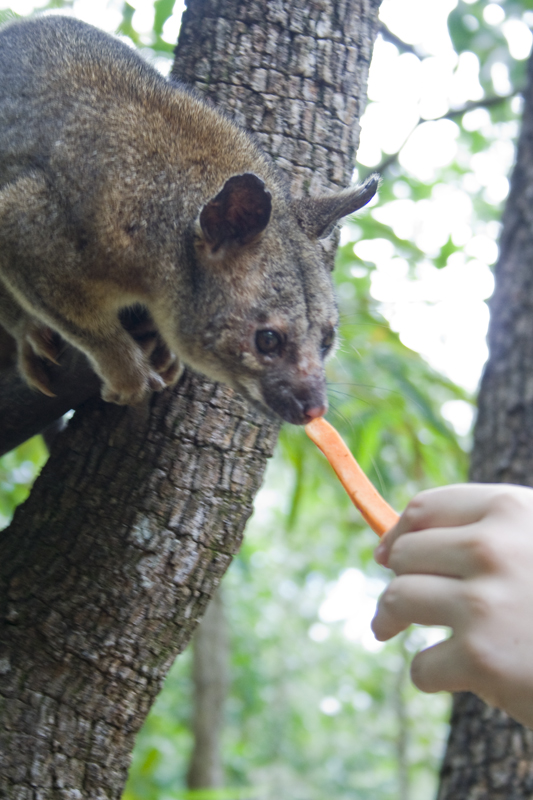
Male northern brushtail possum being hand fed a stick of carrot

== Lifespan and reproduction ==
The northern brushtail possum breeds year-round, with a gestation period around 17–18 days and pouch period of 4–5 months. It can live up to 15 years.

== Diseases ==
Many of the NT possums are found to have contracted a flesh eating bacteria. This causes their faces to be eaten away and often results in blindness. The disease has been widely spread within the possum community, also affecting Ringtail possums. Possums brought into the local RSPCA after contracting the disease are commonly put down. Once the possums contract the sickness they are often found to be more welcoming to humans, and will approach when practical.

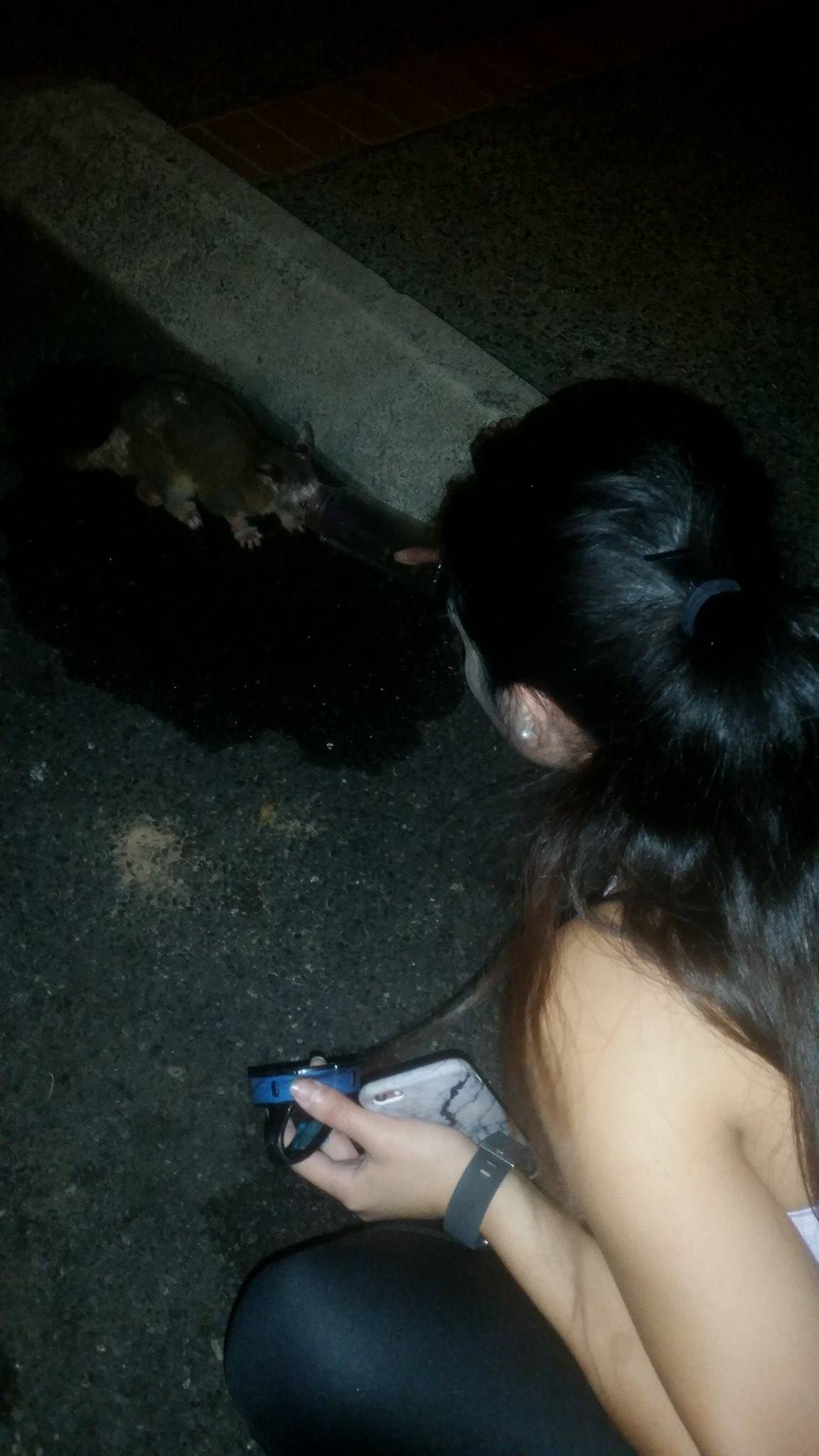
Assisting a sick possum with a drink of water

== Relationship with humans ==
The northern brushtail possum is well adapted to rural and urban areas and is sometimes considered a pest when found in high numbers. Like other possums, it is rather tolerant of humans and can sometimes be hand fed, although it is not encouraged, as its claws are quite sharp and can cause infection or disease to humans if scratched.

It is a traditional food source for some Indigenous Australians. In the Kunwinjku language it is known as djebuyh. According to Reverend P. Nganjmirra, Kunwinjku elder, it tastes "good". It is cooked in a hole like bandicoot.

== Diet ==
The northern brushtail possum eats a variety of plant matter, including fruit, leaves, flowers, and seeds. Brushtail possums are known to be tolerant of many plant toxins and can eat tree leaves that other animals find poisonous. Possums also eat insects, moths, grubs, snails, birds’ eggs, and chicks. Many of the possums' favourite foods are unfortunately found in domestic gardens, drawing the possums into residential yards.
