= Telefomin cuscus =

Conservation status
- Critically endangered, possibly extinct (IUCN 3.1)

Scientific classification
- Kingdom: Animalia
- Phylum: Chordata
- Class: Mammalia
- Infraclass: Marsupialia
- Order: Diprotodontia
- Family: Phalangeridae
- Genus: Phalanger
- Species: P. matanim

Binomial name
- Phalanger matanim Flannery, 1987
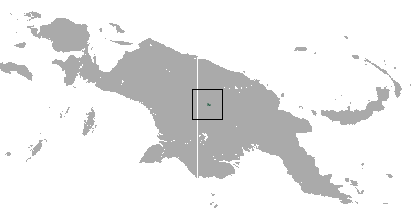
- Telefomin cuscus range

Species of marsupial

The Telefomin cuscus (Phalanger matanim) is a critically endangered possum found on New Guinea. It is named after the Telefol ethnic group, who hunted the animal long before it was identified scientifically by the Australian zoologist Tim Flannery.

== Habitat ==
This cuscus has been found in the Telefomin and Tifalmin regions of Papua New Guinea. It is believed to inhabit an extremely restricted range within the oak forests of a single valley, at elevations between 1,500 and 2,000 m (4,900 and 6,600 ft), along the Nong River Valley north of Telefomin in central Papua New Guinea. Its range may potentially extend further northeast or west of the currently known collection sites. This only confirmed habitat area was largely devastated by a fire in 1998, which resulted from drought conditions during an El Niño event.

== Status ==
After 1997's drought, extremely cold weather ("bitter frosts") which killed the trees, and resulting wildfires, the species' habitat forests were destroyed, which Flannery believes might have resulted in the species' extinction.

In 2022, British amateur naturalist Michael Smith claimed he had found various Telefomin cuscus being eaten by a local tribe. He confirmed it to be the once-thought-extinct species by collecting photographs and measurements of their skulls, indicating that this species is still surviving in the wild.
