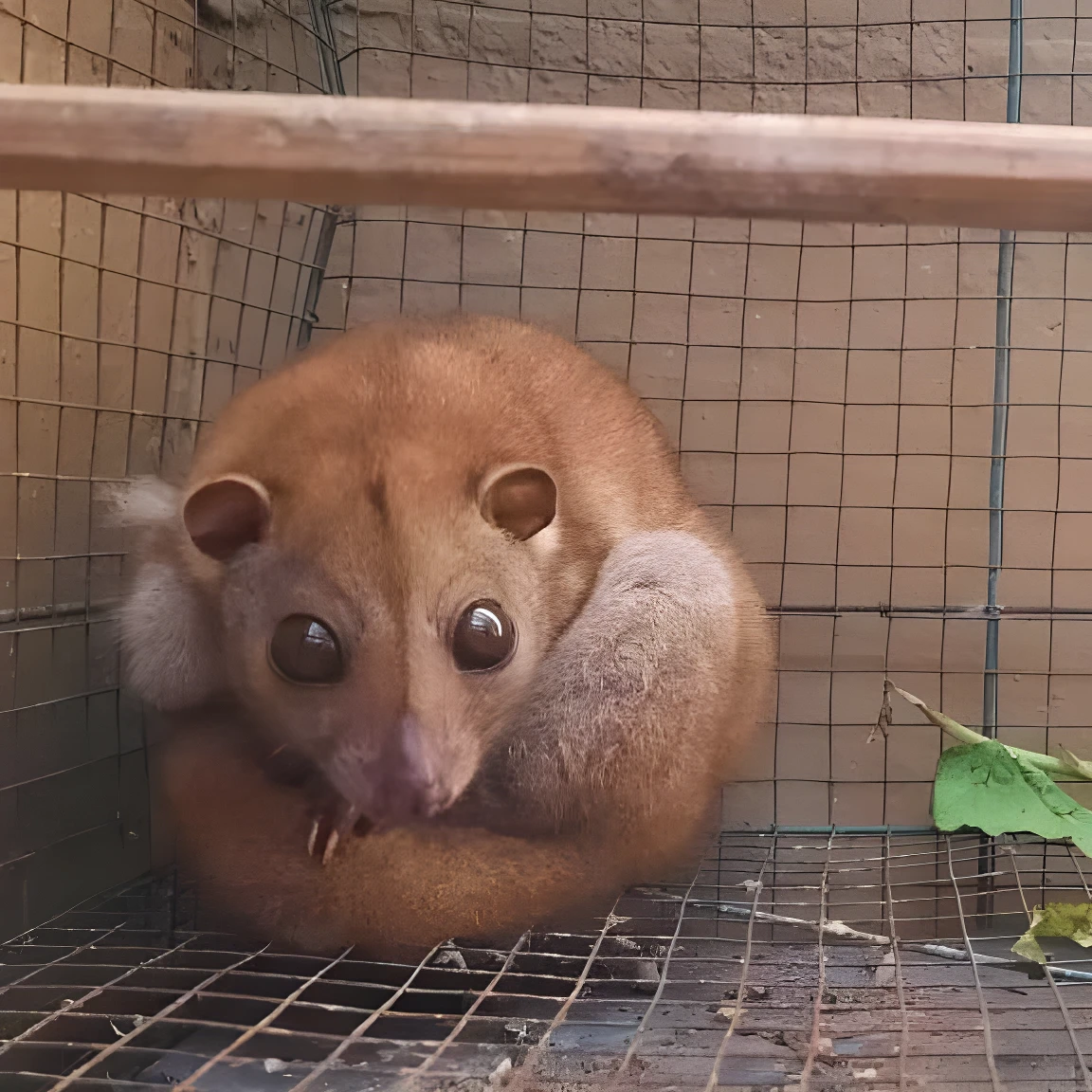

Conservation status
- Least Concern (IUCN 3.1)
- CITES Appendix II (CITES)

Scientific classification
- Kingdom: Animalia
- Phylum: Chordata
- Class: Mammalia
- Infraclass: Marsupialia
- Order: Diprotodontia
- Family: Phalangeridae
- Genus: Phalanger
- Species: P. orientalis

Binomial name
- Phalanger orientalis (Pallas, 1766)
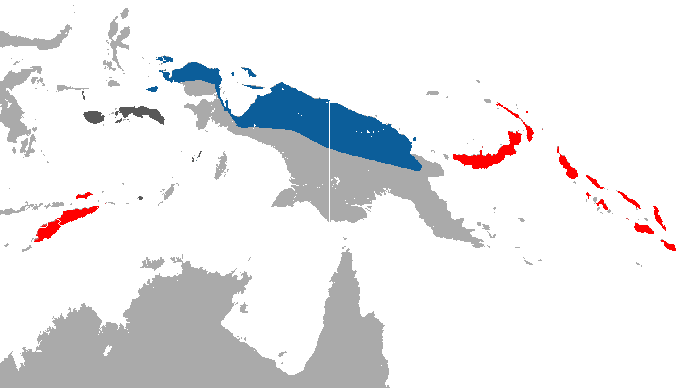
- Northern common cuscus range (blue — native, red — introduced, dark gray — origin uncertain)

= Northern common cuscus =

Species of marsupial

The northern common cuscus (Phalanger orientalis), also known as the gray cuscus, is a species of marsupial in the family Phalangeridae native to northern New Guinea and adjacent smaller islands, but is now also found in the Bismarck Archipelago, southeast and central Moluccas, the Solomons, and Timor, where it is believed to have been introduced in prehistoric times from New Guinea. It was formerly considered conspecific with the allopatric P. intercastellanus and P. mimicus.

It is hunted for human consumption in New Guinea.

== Names ==
It is known as laku ita in the Naueti language or meda in the Tetum Terik Tetum language of Timor-Leste.

== Habitat ==
The northern common cuscus normally inhabits disturbed habitats. These would include secondary forest, plantations, and gardens. This species is also found in primary tropical forests. While living in the arboreal environments, hunters in the area believe that the tree hollows are the preferred den site of the cuscus. Local villagers reported that the northern common cuscus can be found in any substantially forested areas from coastal monsoon rainforest and gallery forest to the remnant montane rainforest.

== Distribution ==
The northern common cuscus inhabits the islands of Timor, specifically Indonesia and Timor-Leste, Wetar and Leti (both to Indonesia) through the Kai Islands and a number of the Moluccan Islands of Indonesia (including Ambon, Buru, and Seram); it is also found on the islands of Misool, Waigeo, Batanta, and Salawati (all Indonesia), and ranges over much of the northern part of the island of New Guinea (Indonesia and Papua New Guinea), including a number of offshore islands. It ranges as far east as the Bismarck Archipelago, Papua New Guinea, where it is present on many islands including the islands of New Britain and New Ireland. It also occurs on many of the Solomon Islands. It is believed that many of the insular island populations are the result of prehistorical introductions, possibly including Timor, Seram, Buru, Sanana, the Kai Islands, the Bismarck Archipelago, and the Solomon Island chain. The northern common cuscus was introduced into New Ireland between 10,000 and 20,000 years ago, and into the Solomon Islands after 6,000 years ago; in Biak Island and Supiori Island, it is also an introduced species.

== Niche ==
Generally, its niche is thought to be that of a nocturnal arboreal folivore with frugivorous tendencies.
