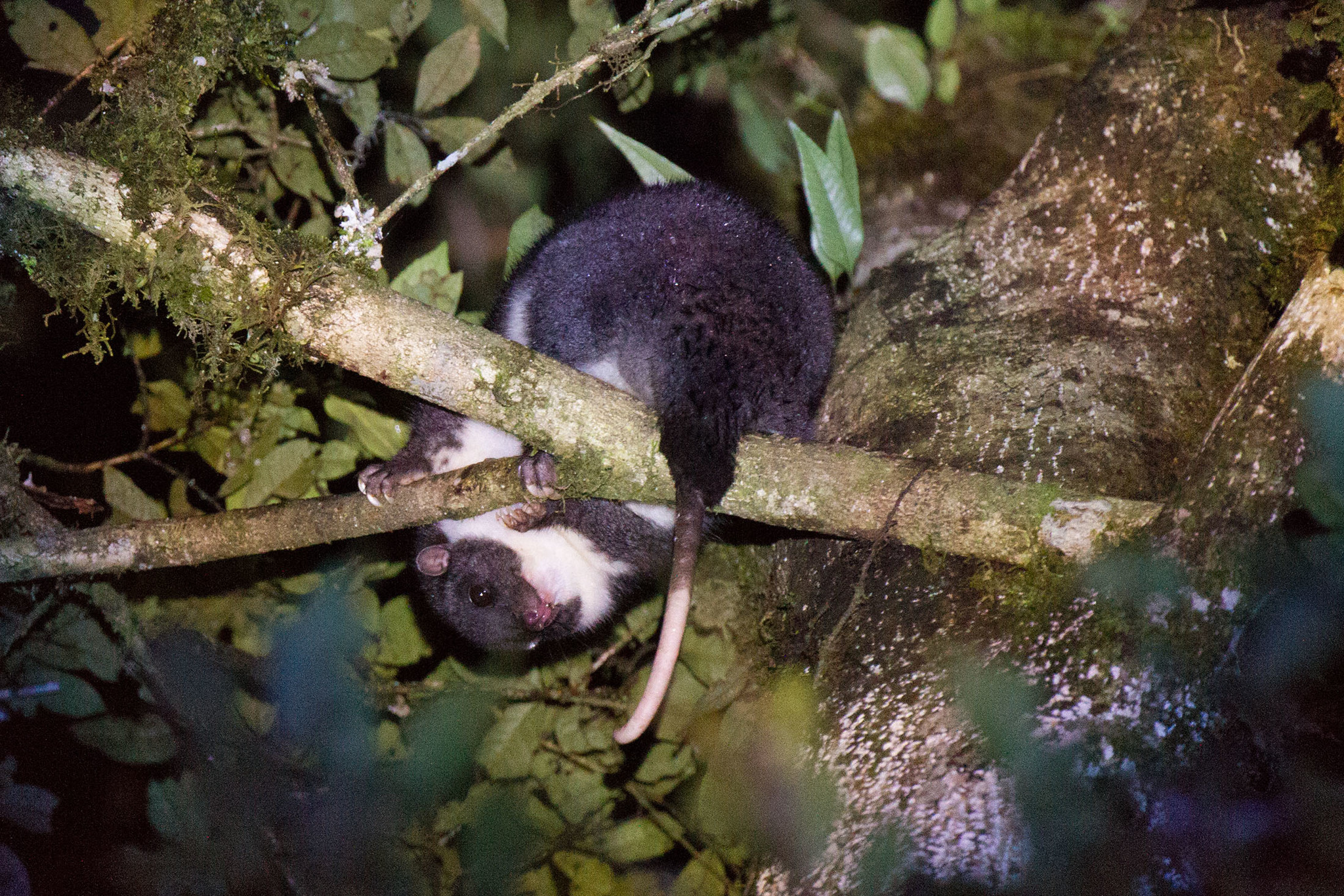

Conservation status
- Least Concern (IUCN 3.1)

Scientific classification
- Kingdom: Animalia
- Phylum: Chordata
- Class: Mammalia
- Infraclass: Marsupialia
- Order: Diprotodontia
- Family: Phalangeridae
- Genus: Phalanger
- Species: P. vestitus

Binomial name
- Phalanger vestitus (A. Milne-Edwards, 1877)
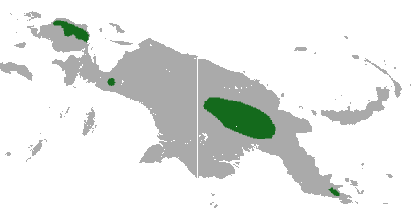
- Stein's cuscus range

= Stein's cuscus =

Species of marsupial

Stein's cuscus (Phalanger vestitus) is a species of marsupial in the family Phalangeridae. It is found in Indonesia and Papua New Guinea.
