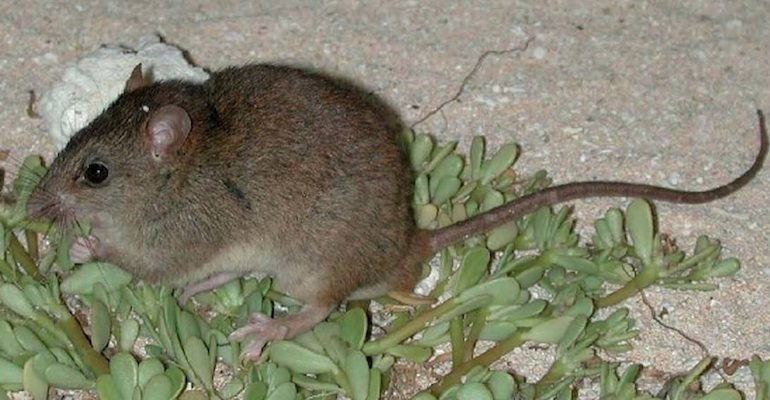

Conservation status
- Extinct (2015) (IUCN 3.1)

Scientific classification
- Kingdom: Animalia
- Phylum: Chordata
- Class: Mammalia
- Infraclass: Placentalia
- Order: Rodentia
- Family: Muridae
- Genus: Melomys
- Species: †M. rubicola

Binomial name
- †Melomys rubicola Thomas, 1924

= Bramble Cay melomys =

Recently extinct species of rodent

The Bramble Cay melomys, or Bramble Cay mosaic-tailed rat (Melomys rubicola), is a recently extinct species of rodent in the family Muridae and subfamily Murinae. It was an endemic species of the isolated Bramble Cay, a low-lying vegetated coral cay with a habitable area of approximately 5 acres (2.0 ha) located at the northern tip of the Great Barrier Reef in Australia. Described by researchers as having last been seen in 2009 and declared extinct by the Queensland Government and University of Queensland researchers in 2016, it was formally declared extinct by the International Union for Conservation of Nature (IUCN) in May 2015 and the Australian government in February 2019. Having been the only mammal endemic to the reef, its extinction was described as the first extinction of a mammal species due to anthropogenic climate change.

== Taxonomy ==
The Bramble Cay melomys is an extinct member of the genus Melomys, which contains approximately 20 species of rodents living in the wet habitats of northern Australia (Far North Queensland), New Guinea, Torres Strait Islands and islands of the Indonesian archipelago. The genus is in the subfamily Murinae, and the family Muridae. The Bramble Cay melomys was first discovered in April 1845 by Charles Bampfield Yule, commander of the British ship HMS Bramble on Bramble Cay, a vegetated coral cay measuring 340 by 150 metres (1,120 by 490 ft) located at the northern tip of the Great Barrier Reef. At that time, the animal was so plentiful that his crew shot them with bows and arrows for fun. In May 1845, while visiting Bramble Cay via HMS Fly, naturalist John MacGillivray and Joseph Jukes collected a holotype, stored today in the British Museum of Natural History. From the specimen, Oldfield Thomas formally described and named the species Melomys rubicola in 1924. DNA obtained from historic specimens indicates that its closest relative in Australia is the Cape York melomys (Melomys capensis), with the genetic divergence between the two species being so low that it was barely above what would be expected for diversity within species.

== Description ==
Melomys rubicola was relatively large for a rodent, with a body-length ranging from 14.8 to 16.5 centimetres (5 7/8 to 6 1/2 in) and a tail-length between 14.5 and 18.5 centimetres (5 3/4 and 7 1/4 in). Compared to other rats, it had a long tail, short ears, and large feet. Its weight was recorded as between 78 and 164 grams (2 3/4 and 5 3/4 oz). The tail was prehensile at the tip and covered with rough scales. The fur was reddish brown above and greyish brown below, with black guard hairs on its back. It was similar in appearance to the Cape York melomys, to which it was closely related. As with other species of melomys, it was described as having a Roman nose.

== Distribution and ecology ==
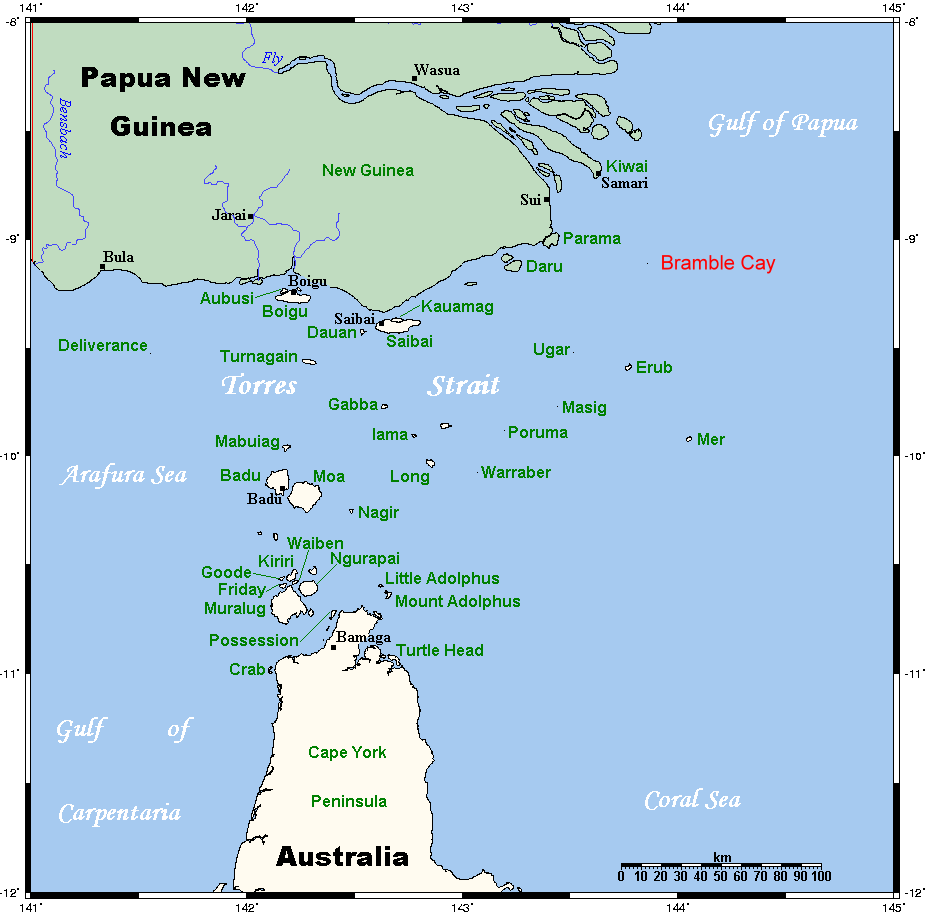
The Bramble Cay melomys was endemic to a low-lying cay in the Torres Strait.

Scientists are uncertain on how the animal reached Bramble Cay. Studies have theorized that it either reached Bramble Cay from the island of New Guinea by floating on driftwood, or that it reached the region when it was still above water at a time when Australia was connected to New Guinea by a land bridge, and then persisted into recent times.

The Bramble Cay melomys was described in 2002 as Australia's most isolated mammal. The cay is located in the northeastern portion of the Torres Strait, approximately 50 kilometres (31 mi) from the mouth of the Fly River in Papua New Guinea. The cay is between 4 and 5 hectares (9 7/8 and 12 3/8 acres), but the rodent only occupied the vegetated portion of the island, measuring approximately 2 hectares (5 acres). The vegetation of the island comprises grasses and herbs, generally shorter than 0.4 metres (1 ft 4 in).

Although 11 species of plants have been recorded on the island in the past, only three to five species have been recorded as present at the same time. Common species include Portulaca oleracea, Boerhavia albiflora, Cenchrus echinatus, and Amaranthus viridis. Three species were observed in 1994: Amaranthus viridis, Boerhavia tetrandra (genus Boerhavia), a type of spinach eaten by humans; and Lepturus repens. A 1998 study showed significant loss of vegetation since 1924, mostly on the southern and northern shores of the island.

The island was also characterised by large populations of seabirds, as well as ecological disturbance caused by annual green turtle breeding. The Bramble Cay melomys preferred the more densely vegetated areas, and avoided those parts of the island that had high densities of seabirds. The species was observed to feed on P. oleracea as well as on turtle eggs. The breeding season of the species was lengthy, and the sex ratio was skewed towards females.

Population estimates for the species varied widely. Observers in 1845 stated there were "hundreds" of the animal present, as did a survey from 1978. A 1998 survey captured 42 animals, and based on that, estimated the population size at approximately 90 individuals. Subsequent surveys in 2002 and 2004 only captured 10 and 12 individuals, respectively. The population was variously estimated as fewer than 50 mature individuals, and as fewer than 100 individuals, in 2008.

== Status and conservation ==
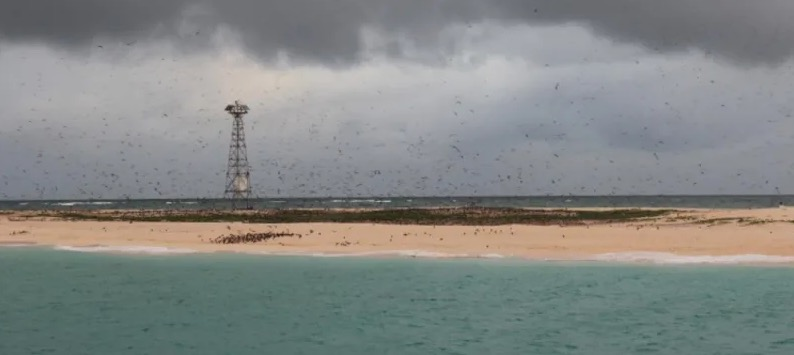
Bramble Cay, as seen from a boat during a survey of the Bramble Cay melomys in 2014

The habitat of the species was generally described as being vulnerable to severe weather and rising sea level, as a result of its low elevation (the island does not rise further than 3 metres (9 3/4 ft) above sea level). In 2008, the Queensland Government's Environmental Protection Agency published a recovery plan for the species, prepared by Peter Latch under the Commonwealth Environment Protection and Biodiversity Conservation Act 1999. The recovery plan stated that its objective was to "secure and enhance the status of the Bramble Cay melomys through an integrated program of monitoring, on ground management, searches for other populations and raising public awareness". Despite this the last known sighting of the species was reported by researchers in 2009. Surveys in 2011 failed to find the animal. After a short survey in 2014 found no trace of the species, scientists set out to conduct a thorough search and capture any remaining creatures in order to start a captive breeding program. However, after taking five months to get the necessary permissions, when they arrived in 2015 they could not find a single melomys.

In June 2016, researchers from Queensland's Department of Environment and Heritage Protection and the University of Queensland jointly reported that the species had indeed become extinct, adding: "Significantly, this probably represents the first recorded mammalian extinction due to anthropogenic climate change". The International Union for Conservation of Nature listed the species as extinct in the same year, based on an assessment from May 2015. However, writing in Australian Geographic, Lauren Smith stated, "The authors of the report do note that there is a slight chance that there's an as-yet-unknown population of the species in Papua New Guinea around the Fly River delta area, and that until that area is adequately surveyed, the Bramble Cay melomys should have the tag 'Possibly Extinct' added to the IUCN Red listing."

The Australian Government's Department of the Environment and Energy formally recognised the extinction of the Bramble Cay melomys on 18 February 2019. The state Government of Queensland report stated that the likely cause of extinction was inundation of the island multiple times during the last decade, leading to habitat loss for the species and possibly also direct mortality. The sea level had been estimated to have risen by 0.6 centimetres (1/4 in) every year between 1993 and 2010, while the incidence of large increases in sea level, associated with cyclonic storms, also increased.

== Commentary on extinction ==
The report on the melomys prepared for the Queensland Department of Environment and Heritage Protection (DEHP) concluded that the melomys likely became extinct on Bramble Cay between 2009 and 2011, based on anecdotal evidence from visitors to the island. The primary factor in the extinction was assessed as loss of habitat due to erosion of the cay, which by 2014 had reached its smallest recorded size. Extreme weather events contributed to the loss of refugia – including rock caves, crevices and overhangs – that might have allowed a remnant population to survive. Anecdotal evidence was also recorded that Papua New Guineans had illegally visited Bramble Cay to hunt melomys by hitting them with sticks, and that visiting fishermen had allowed their dogs to hunt melomys.

The DEHP report concluded that "significantly, this probably represents the first recorded mammalian extinction due to anthropogenic climate change." The report said the "root cause" of the extinction was sea level rise as a consequence of global warming. Senior scientist for climate change biology with Conservation International Lee Hannah said the species could have been saved. The United Nations's fifth Global Biodiversity Outlook report, published on 15 September 2020, criticised the Australian Government for the extinction.

The reduction in vegetation was most likely caused by increasing ocean flooding as a result of increased frequency and intensity of weather events resulting in very high water levels and storm surges, which was exacerbated by anthropogenic climate change. Ornithologist John Woinarski of Charles Darwin University said that the extinction was foreseeable and preventable; it had been known for years that its position was precarious. He believed that its loss is at least partly due to under-funding for conservation programs and the fact that it was not an animal charismatic enough to garner much public attention. In a 2016 paper, Woinarski and others had stated that the Bramble Cay melomys was one of three vertebrates endemic to Australia that went extinct between 2009 and 2014, and that each of the three extinctions had been preventable.

According to the Sydney Morning Herald, a 2008 "recovery plan" had understated the risks to its survival. The recovery plan had stated that "[The] likely consequences of climate change, including sea-level rise and increase in the frequency and intensity of tropical storms, are unlikely to have any major impact on the survival of the Bramble Cay melomys in the life of this plan."

=== Possible survival ===
The authors of the 2016 DEHP report cautioned that their conclusion of extinction was based solely on observations of Bramble Cay and that it was possible the Bramble Cay melomys had survived elsewhere in the Torres Strait or on the New Guinea mainland. The 1924 description of the species by Thomas suggested a specimen from Sassie Island resembled the Bramble Cay melomys, but this has been discounted due to the relative distance from Bramble Cay. Survival on the New Guinea mainland was considered more plausible, with some anecdotal evidence of melomys observed rafting on oceanic debris, but no direct evidence had been observed of a population outside of Bramble Cay. The report concluded that "a possibility exists that the Bramble Cay melomys occurs in the Fly River delta area of southern New Guinea and so, until this area is adequately surveyed, it may be premature to formally declare the species extinct".

== In popular culture ==
First Dog on the Moon published a cartoon tribute to the Bramble Cay melomys, entitled "A moment of silence for the Bramble Cay melomys, another victim of climate change", on 20 February 2019, and another to remember the anniversary of its extinction.

In August 2021, a group of artists from Erub Island created a series of works called Maizab Kaur Mukeis (the Meriam Mir name for the Bramble Cay melomys), consisting of sculptures of the animal made with ghost nets. The work was inspired by the news of its extinction, with the artists hoping to create awareness of the damage caused by the abandoned fishing nets to marine ecosystems. The work was selected as one of four Queensland finalists for the National Aboriginal and Torres Strait Islander Art Awards (NATSIAA).

== Diet ==
Little is known of the diet, but it is suggested that melomys rats were primarily herbivorous, feeding on leaves, seeds, fruits and flowers. They were scansorial, adapted to climbing rainforest trees to search for food. Melomys were important prey items for many rainforest predators, such as sooty owls and pythons. The melomys had a varied diet, feeding on plant matter, insects, and possibly bird eggs. The ability to survive in a limited habitat with scarce resources showcased the resilience of the Bramble Cay species.

== See also ==
- Holocene extinction
- List of extinct animals of Australia
- List of recently extinct mammals
- Climate change in Australia
