= Cudmore National Park =

National park in Queensland, Australia

- IUCN category II (national park)
- Location within Queensland
- Location: Queensland
- Coordinates: 22°55′30″S 146°18′14″E
- Area: 204 km^{2} (79 sq mi)
- Established: 1998
- Governing body: Queensland Parks and Wildlife Service

Cudmore is a national park in Central West Queensland, Australia, 844 km northwest of Brisbane. The terrain of the park has an elevation of 398 metres.

== Wildlife ==
166 species of animals and 147 species of plants have been recorded in the park. The most endangered on the list of plants is Drummond Range bloodwood (Corymbia clandestina). Among the rare or endangered mammals in the park are the central greater glider and koala.

== See also ==
- Protected areas of Queensland
