= John Woinarski =

Australian ornithologist, mammalogist, and herpetologist

John Casimir Zichy Woinarski is an Australian ornithologist, mammalogist, and herpetologist. He was awarded the 2001 Eureka Prize for Biodiversity Research. In the same year he was the recipient of the D. L. Serventy Medal, awarded by the Royal Australasian Ornithologists Union for outstanding published work on birds in the Australasian region.

Woinarski is currently Professor in the Research Institute for the Environment and Livelihoods, a part-time position at Charles Darwin University, in Darwin, Northern Territory. Much of his work has been focused on the conservation of threatened species and he has extensively published work on the responses of biodiversity to fire. He is a co-author of The Action Plan for Australian Mammals 2012.

In February 2019, speaking about the confirmed extinction of the Bramble Cay melomys, considered the only mammal endemic to the Great Barrier Reef and the first documented extinction of a mammal species due to climate change, he said that its loss was foreseeable and preventable. It had been known for years that its position was precarious, and he believed that its loss is at least partly due to under-funding for conservation programs and the fact that it was not an animal charismatic enough to garner much public attention.

After the 2019–20 Australian bushfire season Woinarski became a member of the Australian Commonwealth’s Wildlife and threatened species bushfire recovery Expert Panel.

In May 2020 the Federal Court of Australia accepted Woinarski's contributed expert opinion for the protection of some important forests in South Eastern Australia, being the threatened natural habitat of Australia's iconic Greater Glider and the Leadbeater’s Possum.

== Awards and recognition ==
Woinarski was awarded a Christensen Research Fellowship in 1987. He won three awards in 2001, the Eureka Prize for Biodiversity Research, the Australian Natural History Medallion and the Serventy Medal. In 2008 he was recognised for his work in the Northern Territory by the awards, NT Chief Minister's Award for Research and Innovation and the NT Tropical Knowledge Research and Innovation Award. He was elected a Fellow of the Royal Zoological Society of New South Wales in 2017.

== Selected bibliography ==
=== Books ===
- Cats in Australia: Companion and Killer. Woinarski, J., Legge, S., Dickman, C. (CSIRO Publishing, 2019) ISBN 978-1-486-30843-9
- A Bat's End: The Christmas Island Pipistrelle and Extinction in Australia. Woinarski, J. (CSIRO Publishing, 2018) ISBN 978-1-486-30863-7
- ’’Recovering Australian Threatened Species - A book of hope.’’ Garnett, S., Latch, P., Lindenmayer, D., Woinarski, J. (CSIRO Publishing, 2018) ISBN 978-1-486-30741-8

== Sources ==
- Brooker, Michael; & Ridpath, Michael. (2001). D.L. Serventy Medal 2001: Citation. John C.Z. Woinarski. Emu 101: 272.
- Robin, Libby. (2001). The Flight of the Emu: a hundred years of Australian ornithology 1901-2001. Carlton, Vic. Melbourne University Press. ISBN 0-522-84987-3
