= Metaphya tillyardi =

Offshore emerald

Conservation status
- Least Concern (IUCN 3.1)

Scientific classification
- Kingdom: Animalia
- Phylum: Arthropoda
- Clade: Pancrustacea
- Class: Insecta
- Order: Odonata
- Infraorder: Anisoptera
- Family: Corduliidae
- Genus: Metaphya
- Species: M. tillyardi

Binomial name
- Metaphya tillyardi Ris, 1913

Synonyms
- Anacordulia maccullochi Tillyard, 1926; Anacordulia stueberi Lieftinck, 1938

Species of dragonfly

Metaphya tillyardi is a species of dragonfly in the family Corduliidae, known as an offshore emerald. It has been found on Bramble Cay, near the Papuan coast, and Cape York, northern Australia. Its habitats are unknown.

Metaphya tillyardi is a slim and short-bodied, metallic dragonfly with strong markings.

== Etymology ==
The genus name Hemicordulia is derived from the Greek ἡμι- (hēmi, "half"), combined with Cordulia, a genus name derived from the Greek κορδύλη (kordylē, "club" or "cudgel"). The name refers to the close relationship of the genus to Cordulia.

In 1913, Friedrich Ris named this species tillyardi, an eponym honouring Robert John Tillyard (1881-1937) for his significant contributions to the study of Australian Odonata.

== Gallery ==
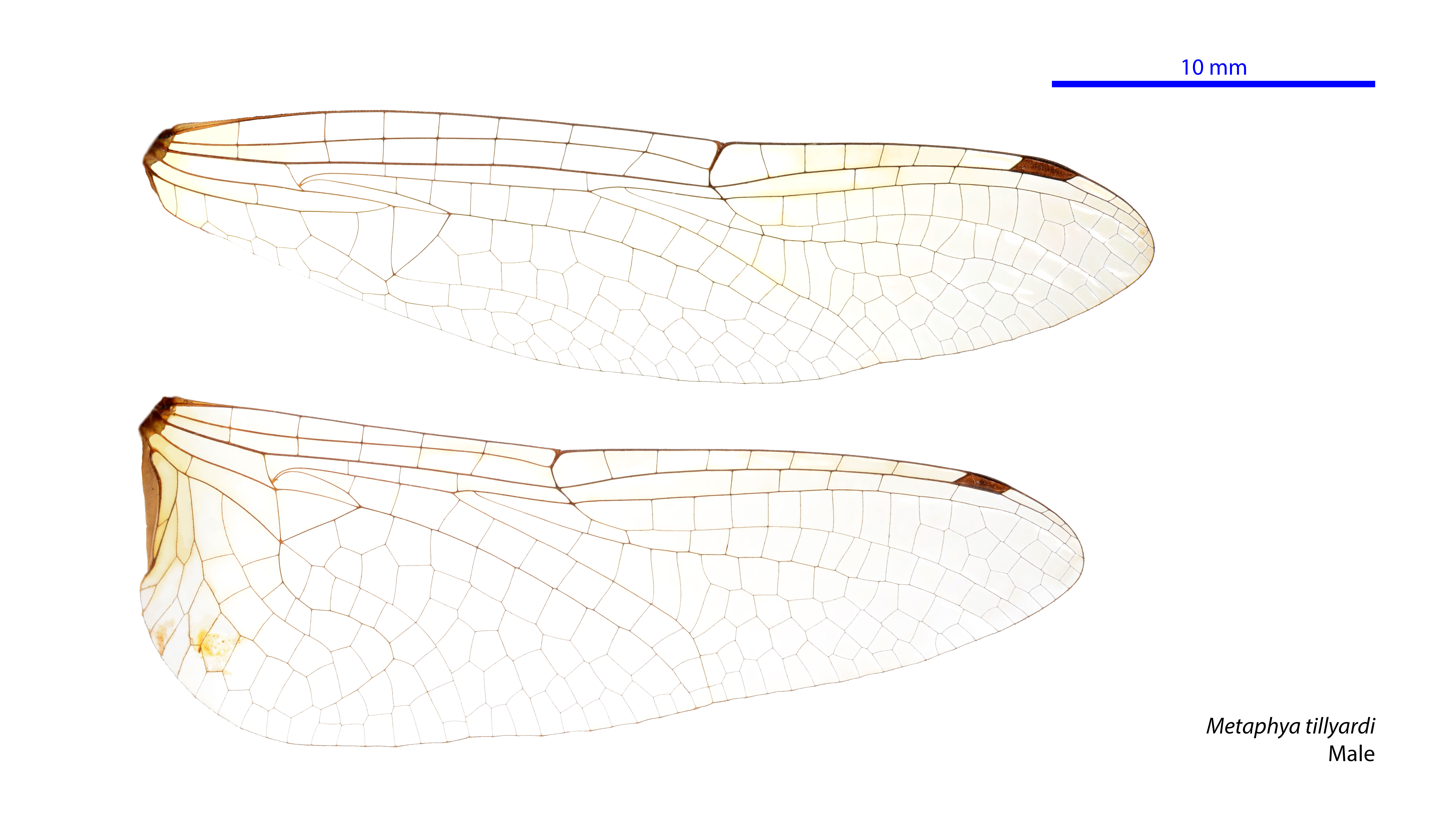
Male wings

== See also ==
- List of Odonata species of Australia
