= Acacia burrana =

Scientific classification
- Kingdom: Plantae
- Clade: Tracheophytes
- Clade: Angiosperms
- Clade: Eudicots
- Clade: Rosids
- Order: Fabales
- Family: Fabaceae
- Subfamily: Caesalpinioideae
- Clade: Mimosoid clade
- Genus: Acacia
- Species: A. burrana

Binomial name
- Acacia burrana Pedley
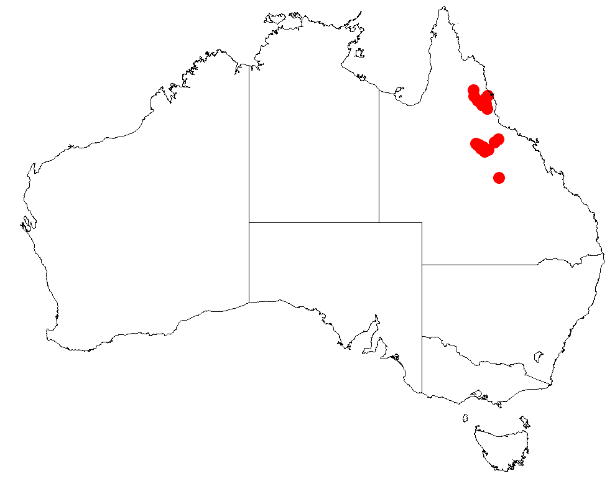
- Occurrence data from AVH

Species of legume

Acacia burrana is a species of flowering plant in the family Fabaceae and is endemic to Queensland. It is a glabrous shrub with usually lance-shaped phyllodes with the narrower end towards the base, spherical heads of golden yellow flowers, and linear pods.

== Description ==
Acacia burrana is a glabrous shrub that typically grows to a height of 1–5 m (3 ft 3 in – 16 ft 5 in) and has slender, angular, dark reddish brown branchlets. Its phyllodes are usually lance-shaped, with the narrower end towards the base, sometimes narrowly elliptic, variable in size but mostly 40–80 mm (1.6–3.1 in) long and 4–9 mm (0.16–0.35 in) wide with three to seven indistinct veins. The flowers are borne in up to five spherical heads 5 mm (0.20 in) in diameter on racemes 0.5–1.5 mm (0.020–0.059 in) long on a peduncle 5–10 mm (0.20–0.39 in) long. Each heads has 20 to 30 golden-yellow flowers. Flowering has been recorded from January to April and in June, and the pods are linear, constricted between the seeds, up to 90 mm (3.5 in) long and 5–6 mm (0.20–0.24 in) wide with oblong black seeds 3.2–4.0 mm (0.13–0.16 in) long.

== Taxonomy ==
Acacia burrana was first formally described in 2006 by the botanist Leslie Pedley in the journal Austrobaileya from specimens collected on 25 km (16 mi) west of Pentland in 1975. The specific epithet (burrana) refers to a part of the Great Dividing Range known locally as the Burra Range, where this species occurs.

== Distribution ==
This species of wattle has a disjunctive distribution in the Petford - Herberton and Mount Garnet areas, and the Lolworth Ranges at the headwaters of Torrens Creek and the Cape River in North Queensland. Another population is found about 300 km (190 mi) further south in the Cudmore National Park. It is usually situated in elevated areas at around 500 m (1,600 ft) above sea level growing in shallow sandy soils with a sandstone base as a part of woodland communities, along with Corymbia trachyphloia and Acacia shirleyi. It is also occasionally found along sandy banks of minor watercourses at lower elevations.

== Conservation status ==
Acacia burrana is listed as of "least concern" in the Government of Queensland Nature Conservation Act 1992.

== See also ==
- List of Acacia species
