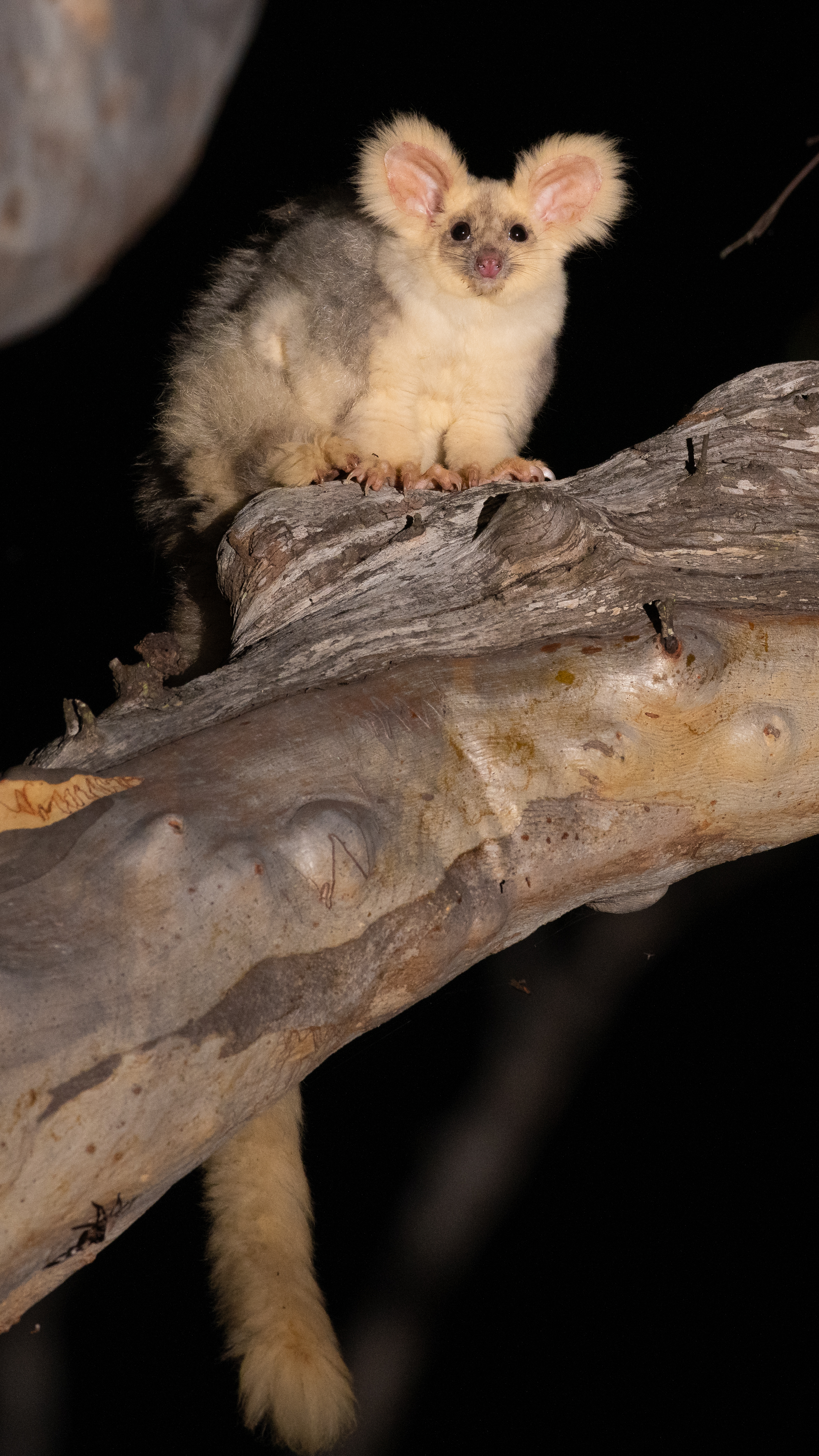
- Light morph, near Brisbane

Conservation status
- Endangered (IUCN 3.1) (includes P. armillatus and P. minor)

Scientific classification
- Kingdom: Animalia
- Phylum: Chordata
- Class: Mammalia
- Infraclass: Marsupialia
- Order: Diprotodontia
- Family: Pseudocheiridae
- Genus: Petauroides
- Species: P. volans

Binomial name
- Petauroides volans (Kerr, 1792)

Synonyms
- Schoinobates volans

= Southern greater glider =

Species of marsupial

The southern greater glider (Petauroides volans), also known as the southern and central greater glider, is a species of large gliding marsupial native to the forests of southeastern Australia. It is an endangered species per the IUCN Red List classification, and since 5 July 2022 has also been listed as endangered under the EPBC Act in Australia. The main threats to its survival are climate change and logging.

== Taxonomy ==
This was the first described species of Petauroides, and long thought to be the only species, with Petauroides armillatus and Petauroides minor being thought to comprise a distinct subspecies of it, P. volans minor; together, they were referred to as the greater glider. However, in 2012 and 2015, several field guides written by Colin Groves and/or Stephen Jackson listed the greater glider as being split into three species, confirmed by a 2020 analysis which found significant genetic and morphological differences between the three species. The American Society of Mammalogists now considers the two subspecies to be distinct from P. volans.

The Australian Government's Species Profile and Threats Database (SPRAT) refers to the animal as the greater glider (southern and central).

== Distribution ==
Prior to being split, this species was thought to be found throughout eastern Australia, but recent taxonomic revisions and splits indicate it occupies a much smaller range. Although Jackson and Groves listed the species as ranging from Bundaberg (Queensland) south to Victoria, genetic analysis by McGregor et al. has found this species to not exist near the alleged northern edge of its range, with that species actually being P. armillatus. It is now thought to range from Victoria north to New South Wales, but due to insufficient sampling from New South Wales, the exact border between the range of P. volans and P. armillatus remains unknown as of 2020.

== Description ==
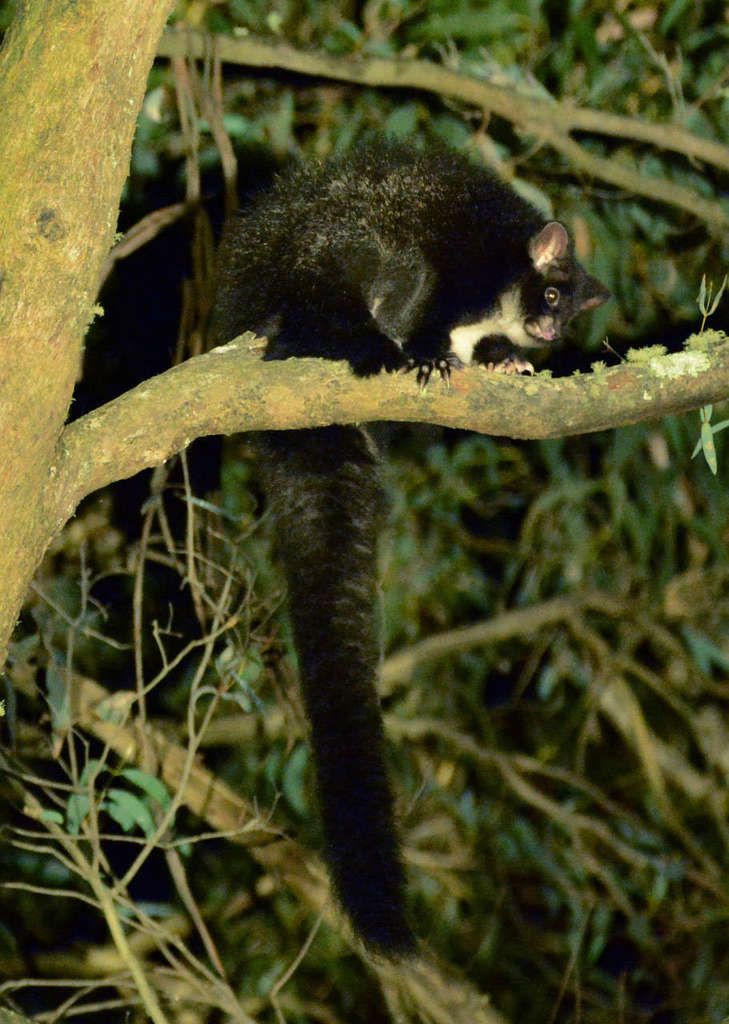
Dark morph, near Lerderderg State Park

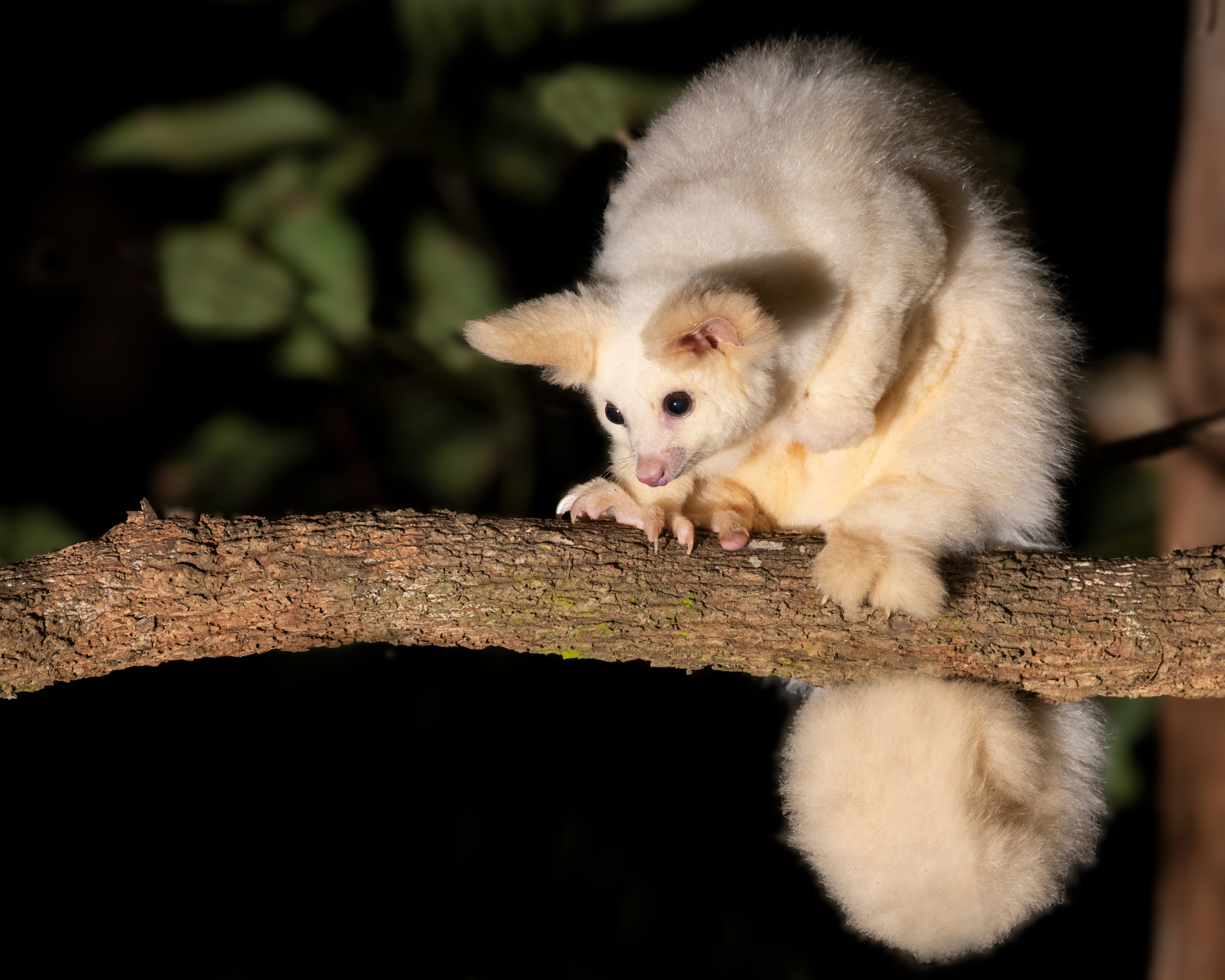

This is the largest species of Petauroides and one of the world's largest gliding mammals, growing to the size of a house cat. Its body spans 35–46 cm (14–18 in). Its furry tail reaches up to 60 cm (24 in) long, but is not prehensile. The gliding membrane stretches from the forearm to the tibia. Its ears are large and furry and it has a short snout.

The glider weighs 900–1,700 g (32–60 oz). The females are larger than males. Its thick fur, which is white or cream underneath and "varies from dark grey, dusky brown through to light mottled grey and cream" above, makes it look bigger than it is. This species displays the famous polymorphism that greater gliders are well-known for, having a dark morph that is almost black in colour with a white underside, and a light morph that is grey and white with a white underside.

== Threats and conservation ==
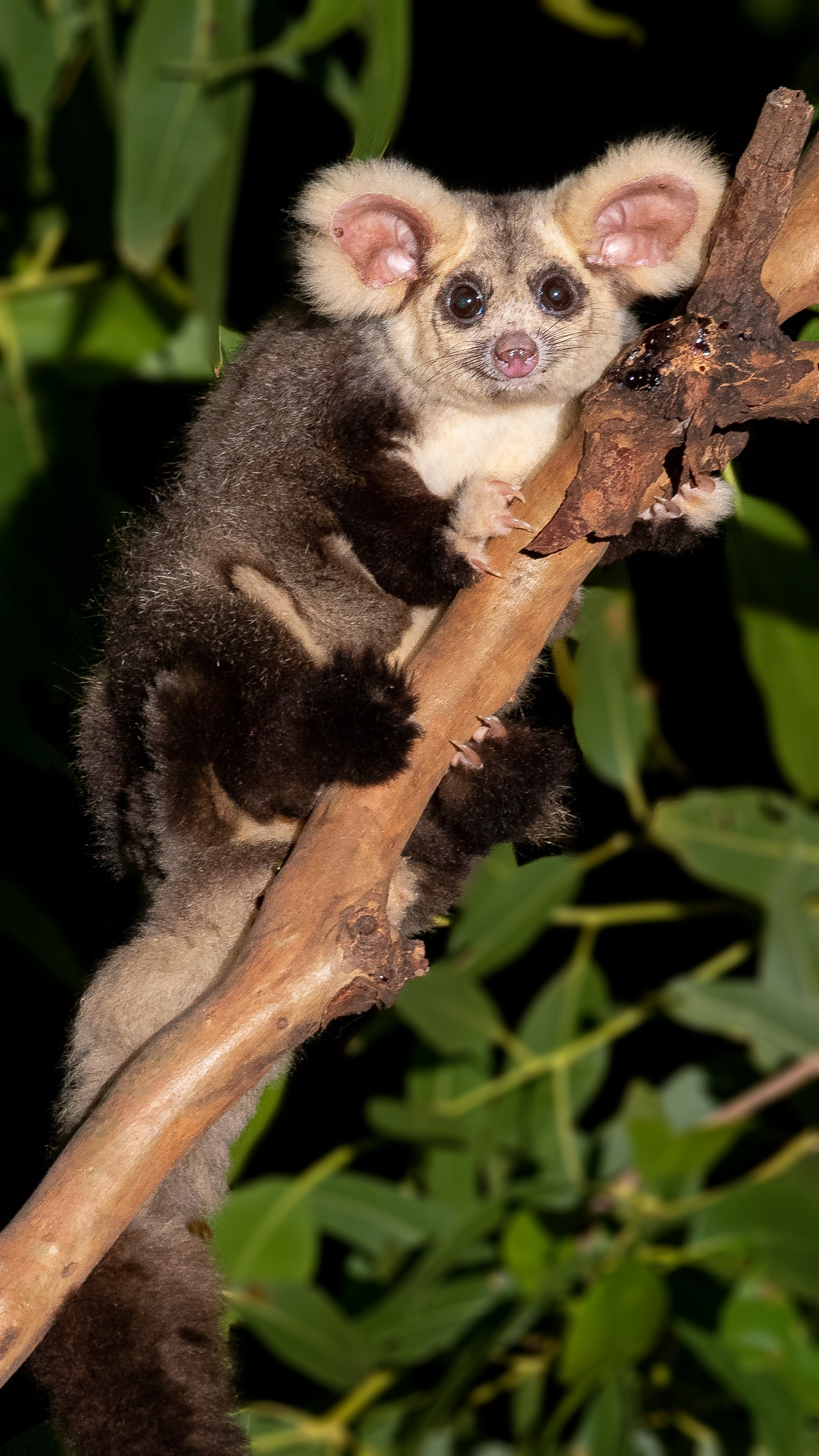

Of the three greater glider species, this one is thought to be the most threatened and to have suffered the sharpest declines in population. Prior to late 2019, significant logging in the forests of Victoria and New South Wales had already led to the removal of vast swathes of hollow-bearing trees that the species depended on, and caused the species to decline by almost 80% in some areas. This was worsened when a significant proportion of the species' habitat burned in the 2019–20 Australian bushfire season; for example, over half of 96,000 acres (39,000 ha) of forest in Victoria set aside for glider protection are thought to have burned in the fires. Logging may have made these fires worse by allowing brushfires to burn hotter, and changing the composition of the landscape to less palatable food trees.

Climate change may also threaten the species in some regions; rising night-time temperatures may cause the cold-adapted gliders to lose their appetite, leading to starvation.

Conservation actions required to save the species include reconsidering the species' conservation status and banning logging and land clearance for coal mining. Ecotourism to view the species may be a potential source of conservation income as well.

Notably during 2022, in the wake of the bushfires the Australian National University, Greening Australia, and the World Wide Fund for Nature-Australia teamed up to place more than 200 high-tech thermally appropriate nesting boxes at Glenboc, in Victoria's East Gippsland, and inside the Tallaganda National Park near Braidwood, NSW. The boxes utilise insulation, air gaps, and heat-reflective, fire-resistant non-toxic coatings, in order to keep the animals and at the optimal temperature, and best imitate a tree hollow.

=== Classifications ===
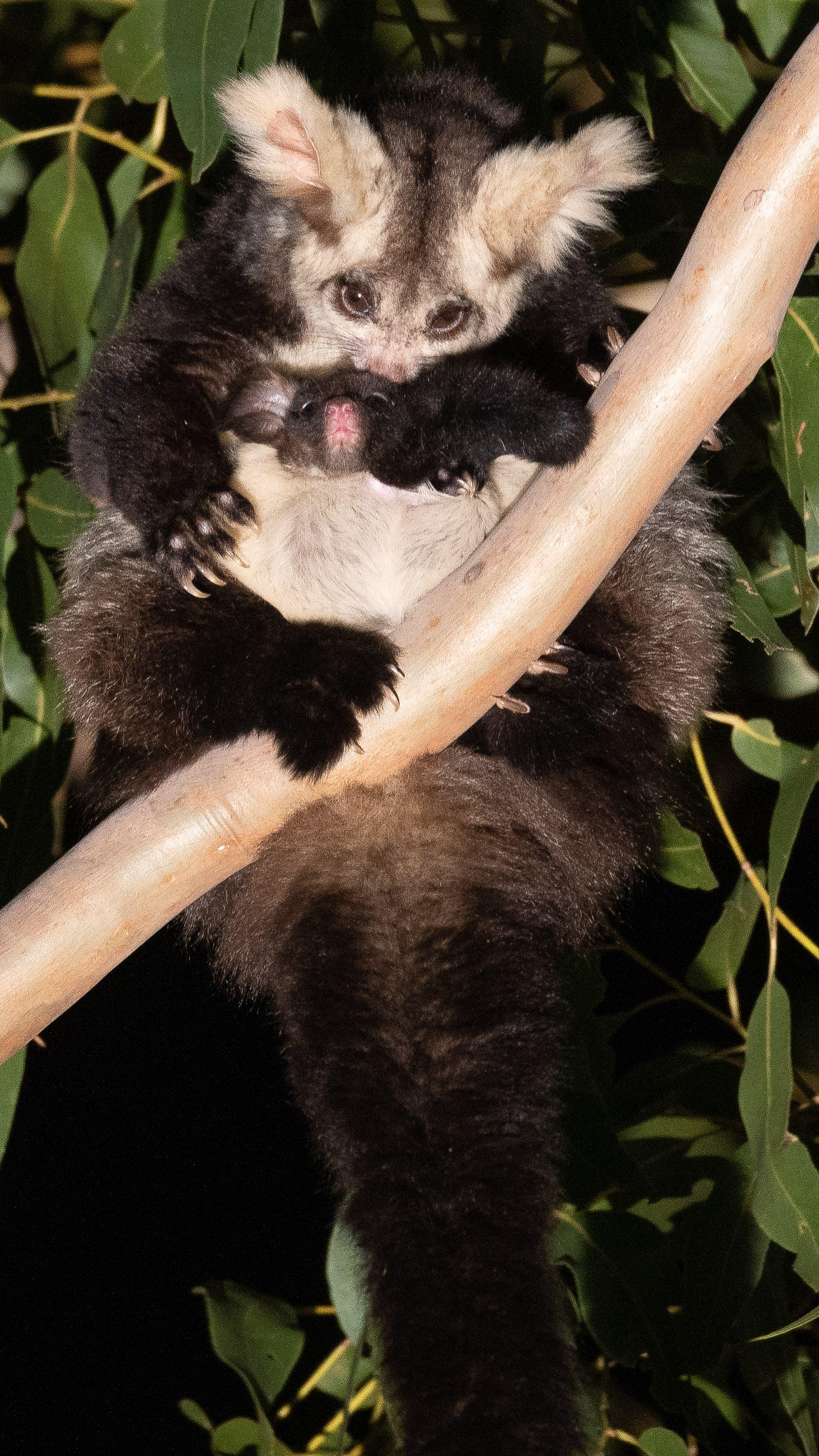

The southern glider is an endangered species per the IUCN Red List classification. On 5 July 2022 the Australian Government declared the animal to be an endangered species under the Environment Protection and Biodiversity Conservation Act 1999, as it becomes more threatened by logging and climate change. Logging is regulated by state governments; however, environment minister Tanya Plibersek said that the federal government was helping to fund ten projects whose goal is to help protect the species.

It is listed as vulnerable under the Nature Conservation Act 2014 (ACT); Nature Conservation (Animals) Regulation 2020 and Nature Conservation Act 1992 (QLD) (which includes both the southern and central and northern greater gliders); and Flora and Fauna Guarantee Act 1988 (Vic); and three subpopulations are listed as endangered under the Biodiversity Conservation Act 2016 (NSW).
