= Bramble Cay =

Island in Queensland, Australia

Coordinates: 9.142°S 143.875°E

Native name: Maizab Kaur
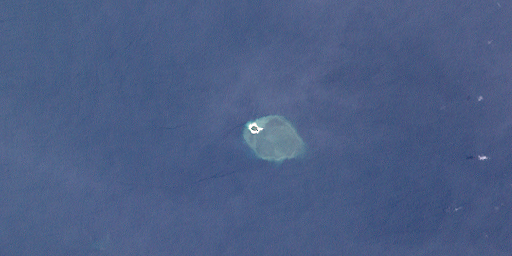

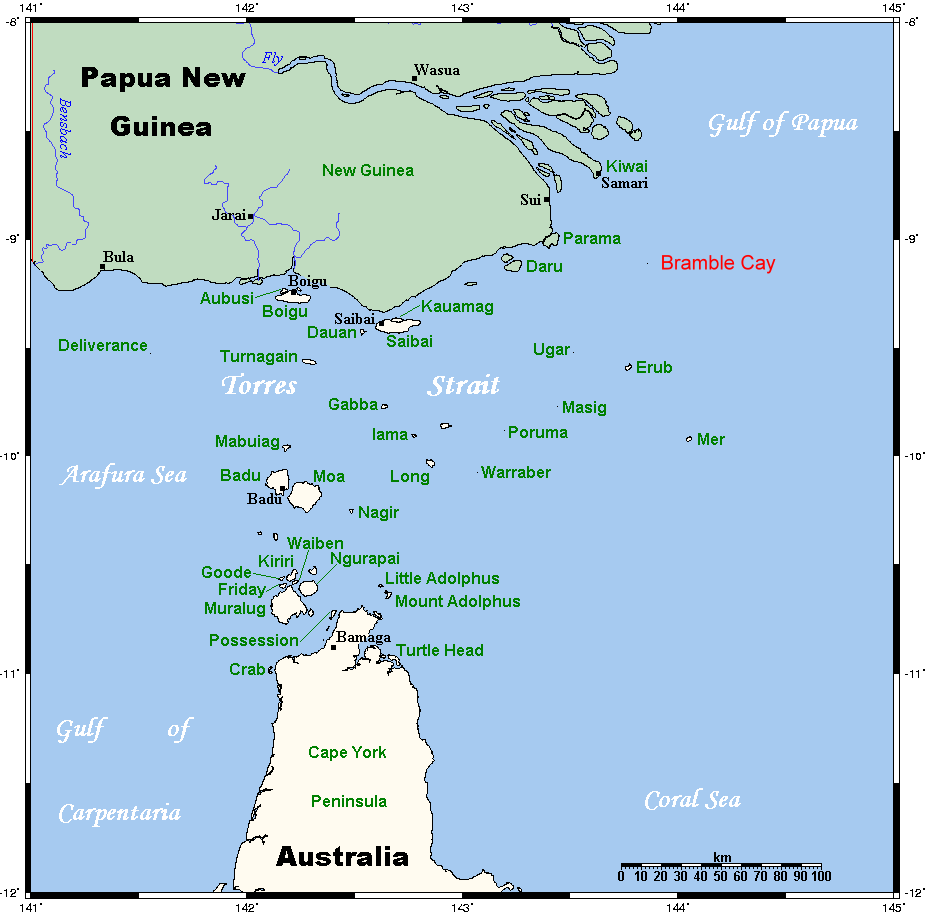
- A map of the Torres Strait Islands in the waters of Torres Strait; Bramble Cay labeled in red in upper right

Geography
- Location: Torres Strait/Coral Sea
- Coordinates: 9°8'23"S, 143°52'54"E
- Archipelago: Torres Strait Islands
- Major islands: Bramble Cay, Black Rocks
- Area: 0.0362 km^{2} (0.0140 sq mi)
- Length: 0.251 km (0.156 mi)
- Width: 0.104 km (0.0646 mi)
- Highest elevation: 3 m (10 ft)

Administration
- Australia
- State: Queensland
- Shire: Shire of Torres
- Island Region: Eastern Islands

Demographics
- Pop. density: 0/km^{2} (0/sq mi)
- Ethnic groups: Torres Strait Islanders

Additional information
- Northernmost point of Australia; Green turtle breeding place

Bramble Cay, also known as Maizab Kaur (also spelt Maizub Kaur) and Massaramcoer, is a small cay located at the northeastern edge of Australia and the Torres Strait Islands of Queensland and at the northern end of the Great Barrier Reef. Lying around 50 km (31 mi) north of Erub Island in the Gulf of Papua, it is the northernmost point of land of Australia and marks the end of the Great Barrier Reef.

It is of interest for its geomorphology, human history and flora and fauna. It is an important nesting site for green turtles and several species of seabird, and is notably the site of the first extinction of a mammal species due to anthropogenic climate change, the Bramble Cay melomys. There is an automated lighthouse on the island.

== Geology ==
The island was formed around a "basalt outcrop produced by Pleistocene volcanic activity and is composed of foraminiferal sand, compacted guano and, at its south-eastern end, a low phosphatic rock platform".

== History ==
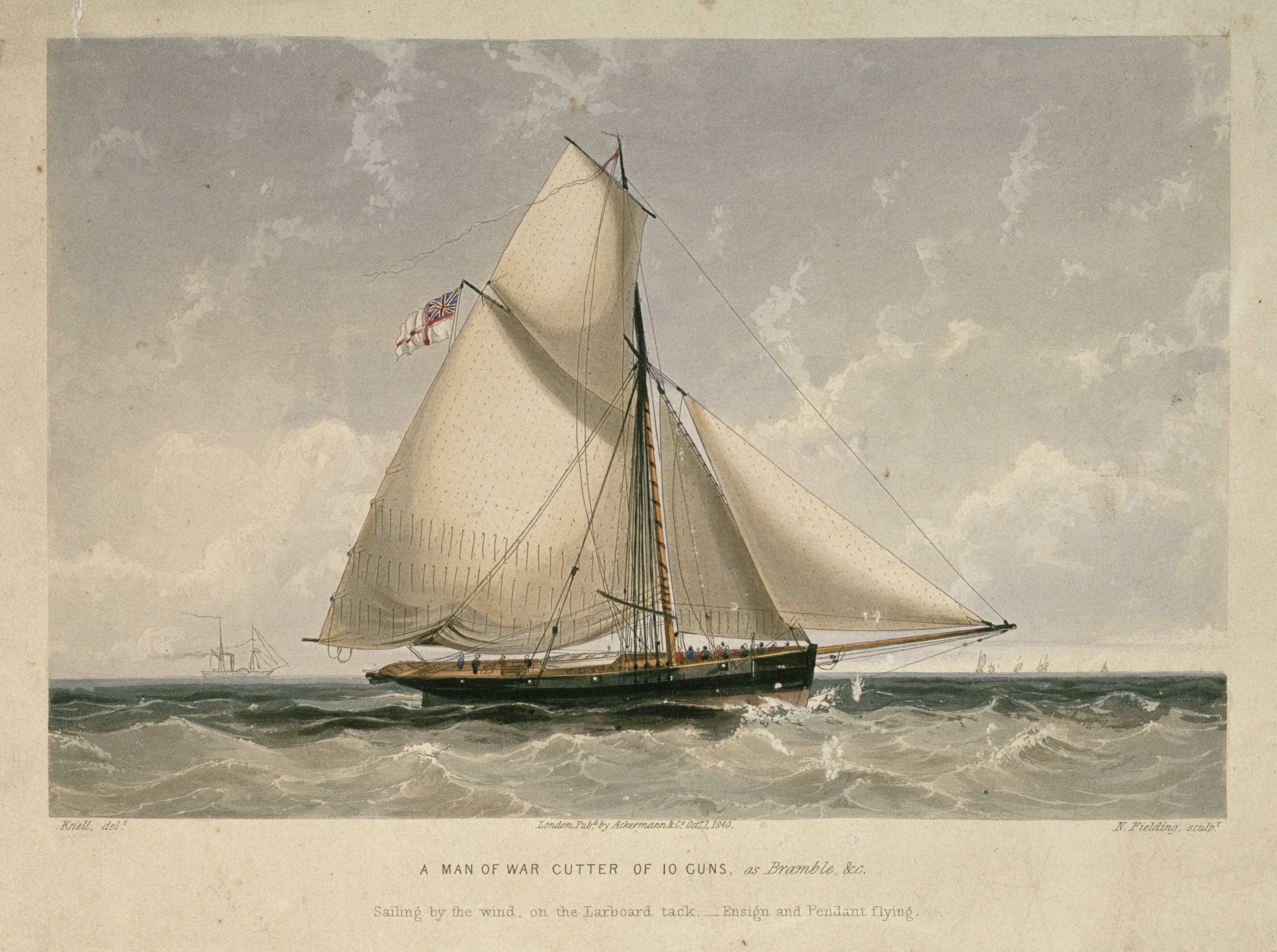
European surveyors from HMS Bramble encountered the island in the 1840s.

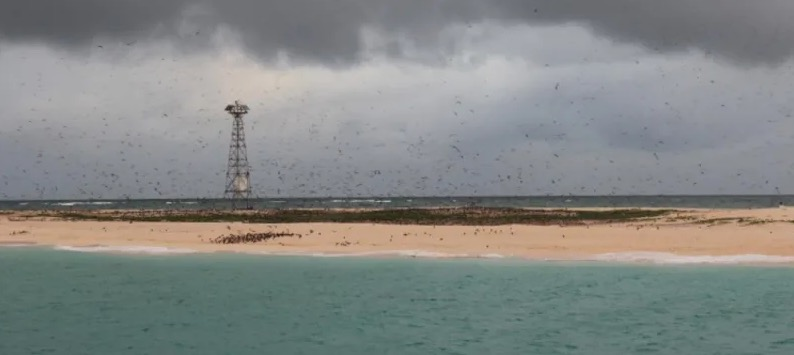
Bramble Cay, as seen from a boat in 2014.

Before being named by Europeans, the name of the island in the Meriam Mir language of the people of Mer Island was and is Maizab Kaur (also spelt Maizub Kaur). People from Erub have been visiting the island for many generations, to hunt and gather food and to look after the environment. Certain families have ancestral connections with the cay.

The cay marks the entrance to the Great North East Channel through the Torres Strait, which has made it significant to human history. The name, Bramble Cay, derives from European surveyors on HMS Bramble, who came upon the island in April 1845.

In 1862, a mining lease was granted to the Anglo-Australian Guano Company and occasionally boats would come to mine the low grade phosphatic rock but due to its low quality, the company did not create a permanent base there.

It has been the site of at least five shipwrecks, resulting in coal being deposited on the cay.

The first lighthouse, a 42-foot (13 m) pyramidal steel tower, was erected in 1924. It was demolished in 1954 and replaced by the present lighthouse, a 17-metre (56 ft) stainless steel tower, which was equipped with solar power on 6 January 1987.

== Geography ==
The sand cay is 3.62 hectares (8.9 acres) in size, and lies about 50 km (31 mi) north of Erub Island (aka Darnley Island), in the Gulf of Papua, around 230 km (140 mi) northeast of Cape York. It is also known by the name of Massaramcoer.

It is surrounded by a relatively small coral reef and is relatively isolated from other reefs in the Torres Strait. There are some bare patches of compacted guano depressions that hold water during the wet season.

About 5 kilometres (3.1 mi) to the southwest are the Black Rocks, also called Rebes, which rise one metre above the water. Three kilometres northeast, maps show submerged Nautilus Reef, the existence of which is doubtful. Bramble Cay and the reefs and rocks close by are separated from other reefs and islets further south by Bligh Channel (Bligh Entrance). To the north and northwest, the Great North East Channel separates them from the coast of Papua New Guinea (Parama Island), which is 48 kilometres (30 mi) to the north.

The closest islet is uninhabited Underdown Islet, about 40 kilometres (25 mi) south. Papua New Guinea (PNG), specifically Parama Island, is 48 kilometres (30 mi) west-northwest. The Papua New Guinean city of Daru, the capital of Western Province, is some 70 kilometres (43 mi) west of Bramble Cay. Bramble Cay is the closest island to the mouth of the Fly River in PNG (at around 55 kilometres (34 mi) southeast).

The 17-metre (56 ft) automatic lighthouse, located east of the centre of the cay, is the only human structure on the island. It is maintained by the Australian Maritime Safety Authority. The cement base of the old (1958) temporary lighthouse tower, once located near the centre of the cay, now sits towards the south-eastern side of the cay at the high tide mark. It is the most northerly navigation aid in Australia, at latitude 9°08.5' S. It also marks the northern end of the Great Barrier Reef.

== Flora and fauna ==
The cay is predominantly vegetated by three herbaceous plants, to about 40 cm (16 in) in height. Although 11 species of plants have been recorded on the island in the past, only three to five species have been recorded as present at the same time. Common species include Portulaca oleracea, Boerhavia albiflora, Cenchrus echinatus, and Amaranthus viridis. Three species were found in 1994: Boerhavia tetrandra (genus Boerhavia), a type of spinach eaten by humans; Amaranthus viridis and Lepturus repens. The same study (published 1998) showed significant loss of vegetation since 1924, mostly on the southern and northern shores of the island.

The island was once home to the Bramble Cay melomys, an isolated species of rodent that was the first mammal species to be declared extinct as a consequence of human-caused climate change.

Bramble Cay is the largest nesting site of green turtles in the Torres Strait (as of 2008). It also supports the only large seabird colony in the region. A variety of birds nest on the northern side of the cay, with the crested tern the most common one observed in the 1990s. Other species observed at that time included the sooty tern, common noddy, brown booby, and seven other species.

The surrounding sea is rich with algae and algae-loving fish such as unicornfish, wrasse and trumpetfish.

== Governance ==
Administratively, Bramble Cay is part of the Shire of Torres, specifically of the Eastern Islands Region. Although the island is located 25 kilometres (16 mi) north of the Seabed and Fisheries Jurisdiction Line between Australia and Papua New Guinea, the Australian sovereignty is undisputed and explicitly recognized by Papua New Guinea.

Customary tenure of Bramble Cay is held by the people of Erub (Darnley), the closest inhabited island, 45 kilometres (28 mi) south-southwest. Darnley Islanders travel to Bramble Cay to collect turtle and bird eggs during the nesting season, and also grant people of the neighbouring Eastern Islands, Ugar (Stephens Island) and Mer (Murray Island), permission to collect.

== In the arts ==
In August 2021, a group of artists from Erub Island created a series of works called Maizab Kaur Mukeis (the Meriam Mir name for the Bramble Cay melomys), consisting of sculptures of the animal made with ghost nets. The work was inspired by the news of its extinction, with the artists hoping to create awareness of the damage caused by the abandoned fishing nets to marine ecosystems. The work was selected as one of four Queensland finalists for the National Aboriginal and Torres Strait Islander Art Awards (NATSIAA).
