= Parama Island =

Island in Papua New Guinea

Nickname: Bampton Island
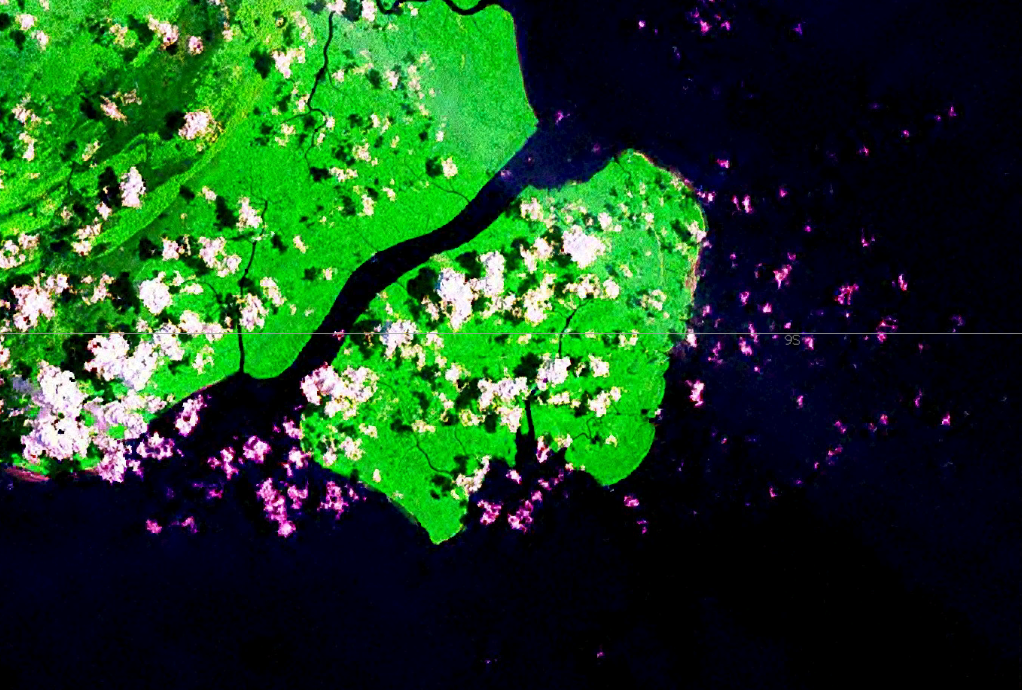
- NASA satellite image (Geocover 2000)

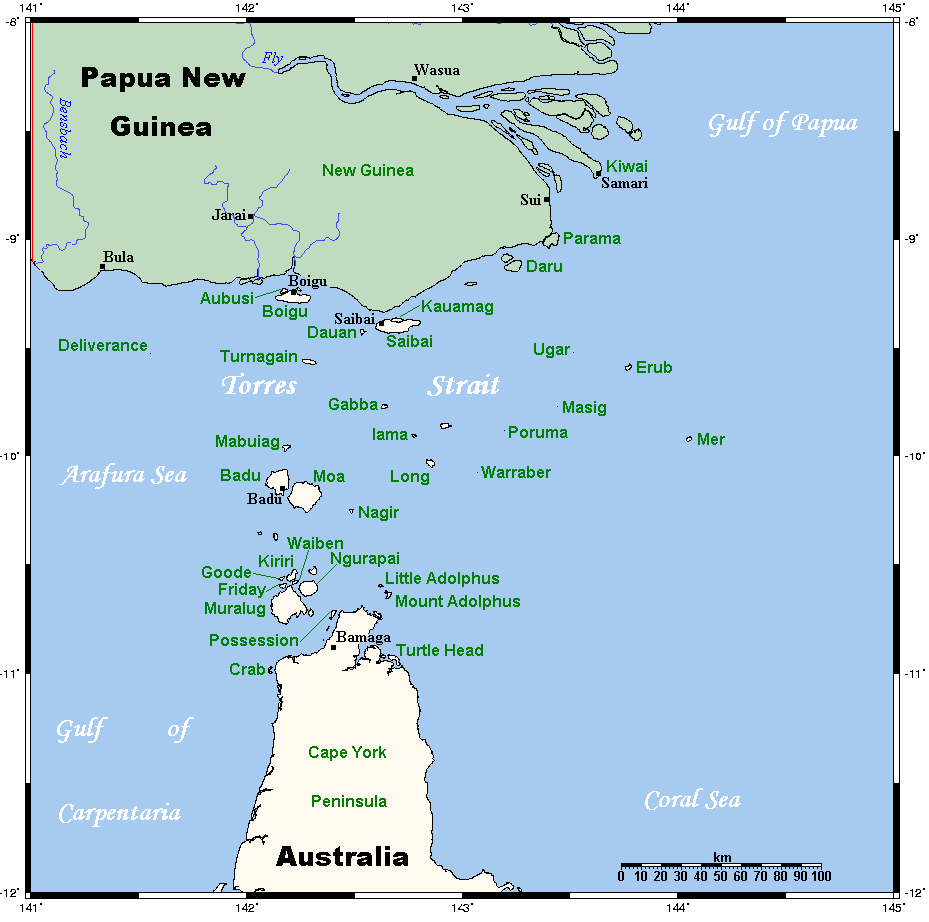
- Parama Island is off the south coast of Papua New Guinea in the Torres Strait

- Location within Papua New Guinea

Geography
- Location: Gulf of Papua/Torres Strait/Coral Sea
- Coordinates: 09°00′09″S 143°24′55″E
- Archipelago: Kiwai Islands
- Area: 36.8 km^{2} (14.2 sq mi)
- Length: 9.6 km (5.97 mi)
- Width: 5.7 km (3.54 mi)
- Coastline: 27.2 km (16.9 mi)
- Highest elevation: 3 m (10 ft)
- Highest point: unnamed

Administration
- Papua New Guinea
- Province: Western Province
- District: South Fly District
- LLG: Kiwai Rural
- Largest settlement: Parama village (pop. 441)

Demographics
- Population: 441 (2000)
- Pop. density: 6.5/km^{2} (16.8/sq mi)
- Ethnic groups: Kiwai

Parama Island (formerly Bampton Island) is an island close off the south coast of Papua New Guinea. It is located 17 km east of Daru, the provincial capital of Western Province (Papua New Guinea), at the southernmost extreme of the Fly River delta, and at the northeastern corner of the Torres Strait. It is the northernmost of the Torres Strait Islands, and at the same time the southernmost of the Fly River delta. Bampton Point, its southernmost point, marks the southwestern corner of the Gulf of Papua. The Coral Sea is southeast. Torres Strait is south and southwest, specifically the Great Northeast Channel, which separates Parama Island from the closest Australian (Queensland) island, Bramble Cay, 48 km ESE.

Parama is roughly rectangular in shape, 9.6 km long and up to 5.7 km wide, with a shore length of 27.7 km and an area of 37 km². It is a low, flat, muddy and mangrove covered island. It is separated from the mainland by Toro Passage, which is 400 to 700 meters wide and seven kilometers long, and 1.8 to 5.5 meters deep.

All of the population of 441 (as of the Census 2000) live in Parama village on the eastern side, facing the Gulf of Papua. An unofficial account in late June 2026 places the population closer to 700, and the figure for 1991 was 240. Only the area around the village is cultivated. The village is divided into six clan divisions. The clans, which have names of animals, are listed, from north to south (1991):

1. Doriomu (Shark, formerly Tebere) (school west outside of clan division)
2. Maruadai (Marowadai) (Cassowary) (with church: United Church)
3. Hegeredai (Dingo)
4. Oromorubi (Dog)
5. Miaridai (Crocodile) (with hospital)
6. Gaidai (Eagle)

A later list (1995) mentions only five clans, thereby replacing Hegeredai and Oromorubi with Sobogu.

In the southwest of the island is Gaziro (Gasiri), a temporary fishing camp also used by mainlanders.

The fringing reef on the eastern shore in front of the village, the "home reef", is called Podomaza.

Worimo Reef, a drying reef of rocks and sand, over which the sea breaks heavily during the southeast trades, extends eight kilometers SSE from Bampton Point. It further extends to Merrie England Shoals, with depths of less than two meters. The area of the reef, mostly submerged, is 18.8 km².

Ellengowan Rock, a submerged rock with a depth of only 1.1 meters, is located 11 km east of Parama Island.

First recorded sighting by Europeans of Parama Island was by the Spanish expedition of Luís Vaez de Torres, that landed on it on 5 September 1606.
