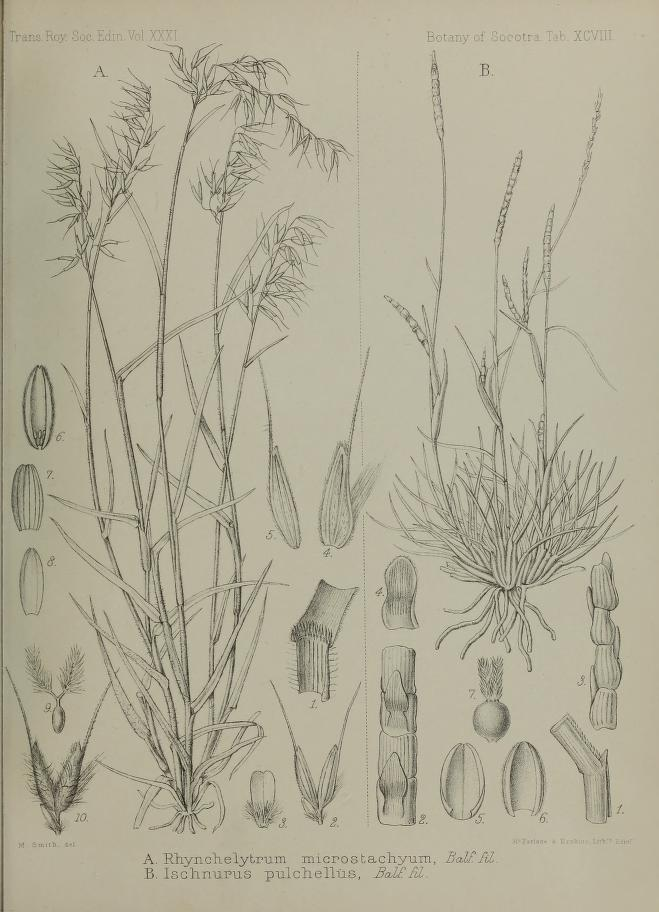
- Figure B

Conservation status
- Data Deficient (IUCN 3.1)

Scientific classification
- Kingdom: Plantae
- Clade: Tracheophytes
- Clade: Angiosperms
- Clade: Monocots
- Clade: Commelinids
- Order: Poales
- Family: Poaceae
- Subfamily: Chloridoideae
- Genus: Lepturus
- Species: L. pulchellus

Binomial name
- Lepturus pulchellus (Balf.f.) Clayton (1982)

Synonyms
- Ischnurus pulchellus Balf.f. (1883)

= Lepturus pulchellus =

Species of plant

Lepturus pulchellus is a species of grass in the family Poaceae. It is a perennial endemic to the islands of Socotra and Samhah in Yemen's Socotra Archipelago. It grows in coastal dwarf shrubland on Socotra, and in desertic foothills on Samhah, from 10 to 200 metres elevation.
