= Metaphya =

Scientific classification
- Kingdom: Animalia
- Phylum: Arthropoda
- Clade: Pancrustacea
- Class: Insecta
- Order: Odonata
- Infraorder: Anisoptera
- Family: Corduliidae
- Genus: Metaphya; Laidlaw, 1912

Synonyms
- Anacordulia Tillyard, 1926

Genus of dragonflies

Metaphya is a genus of dragonfly in the family Corduliidae. Metaphya are found in Asia, New Guinea, Australia, Indonesia and parts of the Pacific region.

== Species ==
The genus Metaphya includes the following species:

- Metaphya elongata Campion, 1921
- Metaphya micans Laidlaw, 1912
- Metaphya tillyardi Ris, 1913

== Etymology ==
The genus name Metaphya is derived from the Greek μετά (meta, "among" or "in the midst of") and φυή (phyē, "form", "stature" or "growth"), referring to its physical similarity to other corduliine genera.
