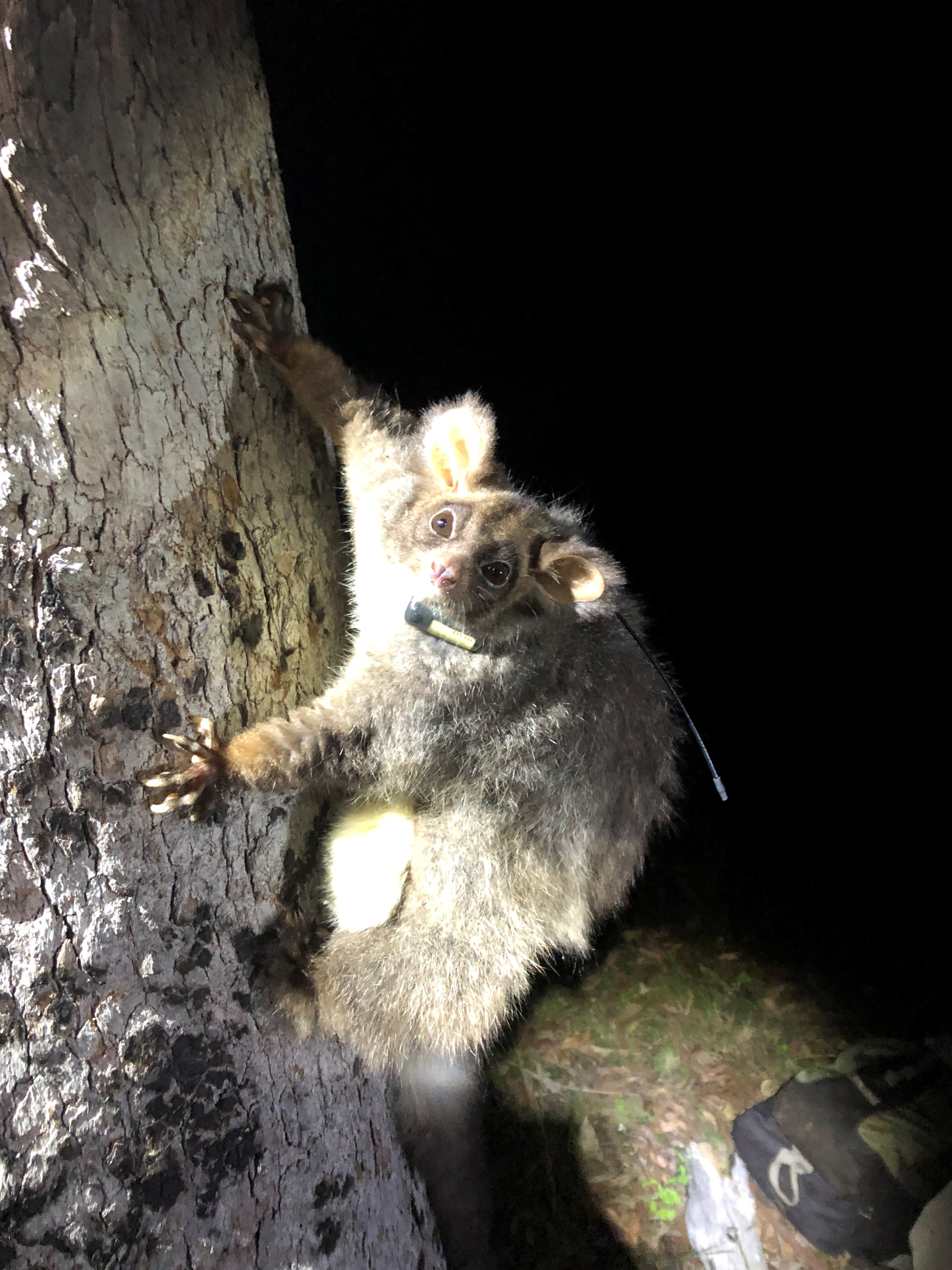
- Near Ravenshoe

Scientific classification
- Kingdom: Animalia
- Phylum: Chordata
- Class: Mammalia
- Infraclass: Marsupialia
- Order: Diprotodontia
- Family: Pseudocheiridae
- Genus: Petauroides
- Species: P. minor

Binomial name
- Petauroides minor (Collett, 1887)

Synonyms
- Petauroides volans minor Petaurista volans minor Petauroides volans cinereus (Ramsay, 1890)

= Northern greater glider =

Species of gliding marsupial

The northern greater glider (Petauroides minor) is a species of gliding marsupial endemic to the forests of north-central Queensland, Australia.

== Taxonomy ==
It was initially described as a subspecies of Petauroides volans, which alongside Petauroides armillatus formerly comprised a single species known simply as the greater glider. P. v. armillatus was also eventually considered conspecific with P. v. minor. However, in 2012 and 2015, several field guides written by Colin Groves and/or Stephen Jackson listed the greater glider as being split into three species, which was confirmed by a 2020 analysis, which found significant genetic and morphological differences between the three species. The American Society of Mammalogists now considers it a distinct species.

There is some evidence of hybridization between this species and P. armillatus near the southern edge of its range.

== Distribution ==
It is the northernmost species of Petauroides. This species ranges from just north of Cairns south to the region just north of Townsville. When it and P. armillatus were conspecific, it was thought to have a much wider range, ranging south to the Tropic of Capricorn.

== Description ==
It is the smallest of the three greater glider species, growing to the size of a small ringtail possum, although it is similar to P. armillatus in body length. It can be distinguished from the other two species by its exclusively brownish-grey pelage, with a cream underside.

== Threats ==
Although not as endangered as P. volans, it is thought to be at risk due its restricted range, with some parts of its habitat overlapping with areas of development.
