= Lepturus calcareus =

Conservation status
- Data Deficient (IUCN 3.1)

Scientific classification
- Kingdom: Plantae
- Clade: Tracheophytes
- Clade: Angiosperms
- Clade: Monocots
- Clade: Commelinids
- Order: Poales
- Family: Poaceae
- Subfamily: Chloridoideae
- Genus: Lepturus
- Species: L. calcareus

Binomial name
- Lepturus calcareus Cope (1992)

Species of grass

Lepturus calcareus is a species of grass in the family Poaceae. It is a perennial endemic to the island of Socotra in Yemen. It grows in succulent shrubland and drought-deciduous woodland and along wadis from 100 to 600 metres elevation.
