= Anderton, Cornwall =

Coordinates: 50.348°N 4.210°W

Anderton: Cornish: Iswoon
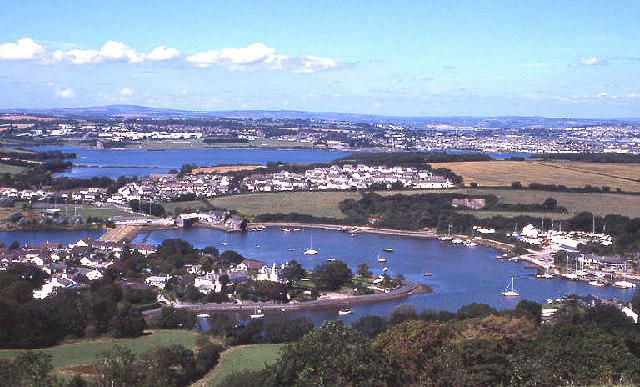
- Anderton and Millbrook Lake

- Location within Cornwall
- OS grid reference: SX 431 519
- Shire county: Cornwall
- Region: South West
- Country: England
- Sovereign state: United Kingdom
- Post town: Torpoint
- Postcode district: PL10
- Police: Devon and Cornwall
- Fire: Cornwall
- Ambulance: South Western

Anderton (Cornish: Iswoon) is a settlement in south-east Cornwall, England, United Kingdom, located at grid reference SW 431 519. There are also places called Anderton in the parishes of Launcells and St Juliot. This Anderton is according to the Post Office at the 2011 Census included in the civil parish of Maker-with-Rame.

Anderton is part of Millbrook, a village on the Rame Peninsula. It is situated beside the tidal portion of Millbrook Lake on the Tamar estuary opposite Plymouth.

Captain Charles Bampfield Yule RN, explorer and author of the Admiralty Australia Directory, died in Anderton in 1878.
