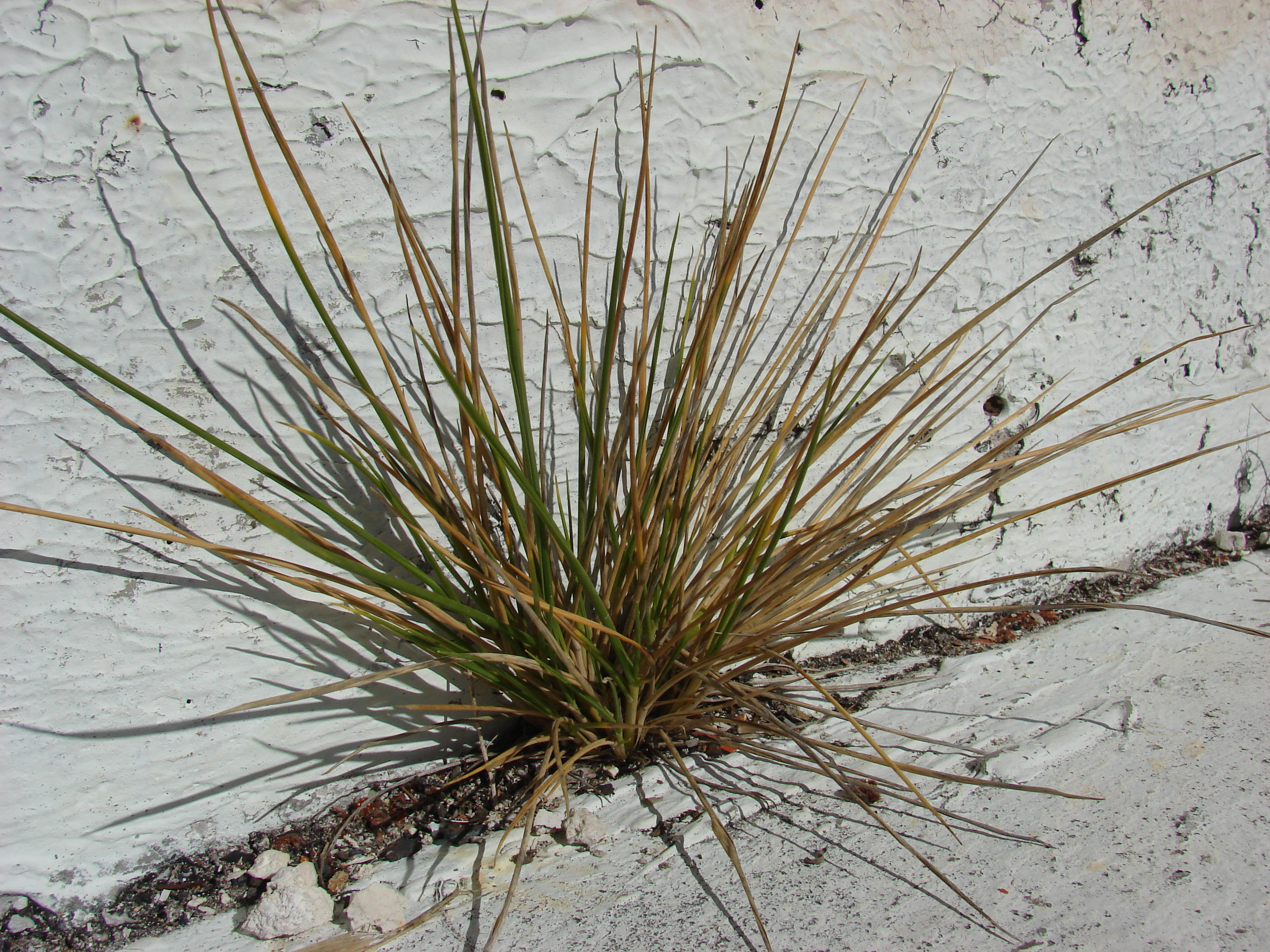
- L. repens

Scientific classification
- Kingdom: Plantae
- Clade: Tracheophytes
- Clade: Angiosperms
- Clade: Monocots
- Clade: Commelinids
- Order: Poales
- Family: Poaceae
- Subfamily: Chloridoideae
- Tribe: Cynodonteae
- Subtribe: Eleusininae
- Genus: Lepturus; R.Br.

Type species
- Lepturus repens (G.Forst.) R.Br.

Synonyms
- Ischnurus Balf.f.; Lepiurus Dumort.; Leptocercus Raf.; Leptocereus Raf., illegitimate homonym not (A. Berger) Britton & Rose (Cactaceae); Monerma P.Beauv.

= Lepturus =

Genus of grasses

Lepturus (common name thintail) is a genus of plants in the grass family, native to Asia, Africa, Australia, and various islands in the Indian and Pacific Oceans.

Species

- Lepturus anadabolavensis A.Camus - Madagascar
- Lepturus androyensis A.Camus - Madagascar
- Lepturus boinensis A.Camus - Madagascar
- Lepturus calcareus Cope - Socotra
- Lepturus copeanus B.K.Simon - Australia
- Lepturus geminatus C.E.Hubb. - Australia
- Lepturus humbertianus A.Camus - Madagascar
- Lepturus minutus B.K.Simon - Queensland
- Lepturus nesiotes Cope - Socotra
- Lepturus perrieri A.Camus - Madagascar
- Lepturus pulchellus (Balf.f.) Clayton - Socotra
- Lepturus radicans (Steud.) A.Camus - Kenya, Tanzania, Malawi, Mozambique, Zimbabwe, Madagascar, Comoros, Mauritius, Seychelles, India
- Lepturus repens (J.R.Forst.) R.Br. - Somalia, Kenya, Tanzania, Mozambique, KwaZulu-Natal, Madagascar, Chagos Is, Mauritius, Rodrigues I, Aldabra, Lakshadweep, Sri Lanka, Andaman Is, Paracel Is, Thailand, Vietnam, Taiwan, Japan, Cocos Is, Malaysia, Indonesia, Philippines, Christmas I, New Guinea, Solomon Is, Australia (including on Bramble Cay in the Torres Strait), many of the Pacific Islands
- Lepturus tenuis Balf.f. - Socotra
- Lepturus xerophilus Domin - Australia

Formerly included

Numerous species now considered better suited in other genera: Deschampsia, Hemarthria, Henrardia, Hainardia, Oropetium, Parapholis
