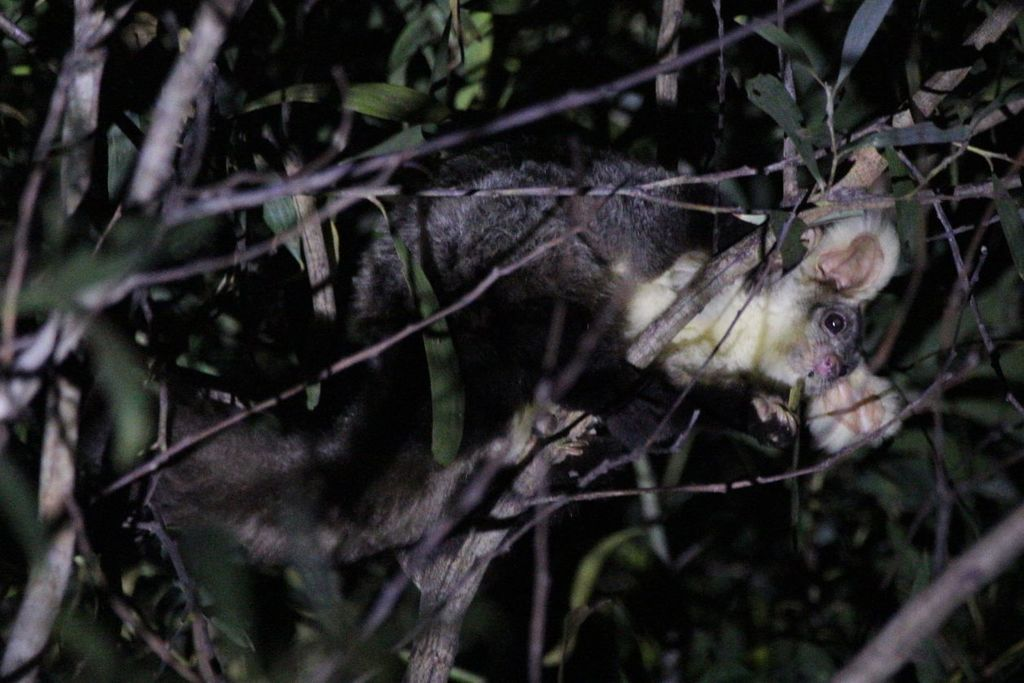
- Near Brisbane

Scientific classification
- Kingdom: Animalia
- Phylum: Chordata
- Class: Mammalia
- Infraclass: Marsupialia
- Order: Diprotodontia
- Family: Pseudocheiridae
- Genus: Petauroides
- Species: P. armillatus

Binomial name
- Petauroides armillatus Thomas, 1923

Synonyms
- Petauroides volans armillatus

= Central greater glider =

Species of gliding marsupial

The central greater glider (Petauroides armillatus) is a species of gliding marsupial native to the central coast of eastern Australia.

== Taxonomy ==
It was initially described as a subspecies of Petauroides volans, which alongside Petauroides minor formerly comprised a single species known simply as the greater glider. It was shortly after synonymized with P. v. minor. However, in 2012 and 2015, several field guides written by Colin Groves and/or Stephen Jackson listed the greater glider as being split into three species, which was confirmed by a 2020 analysis, which found significant genetic and morphological differences between the three species. The American Society of Mammalogists now considers it a distinct species.

There is some evidence of hybridization between this species and P. minor near the northern edge of its range.

== Distribution ==
Although Jackson and Groves listed the species as ranging from just north of Townsville south to the Eungella Range, genetic analysis by McGregor et al. has found the southern limit of the species' range to extend at least as far as Brisbane, and likely even further south. Due to insufficient sampling from New South Wales, the exact borders between the range of P. armillatus and P. volans remains unknown.

== Description ==
This species is intermediate in size between P. volans and P. minor. It is similar to P. minor in body length, and similar to P. volans in ear length and width. It can be distinguished from the other two species by its brownish-silver pelage, with a dark brown face, legs, and tail, and a cream underside.
