= Corymbia clandestina =

Drummond Range bloodwood

Conservation status
- Near Threatened (IUCN 3.1)

- Vulnerable (EPBC Act)

Scientific classification
- Kingdom: Plantae
- Clade: Tracheophytes
- Clade: Angiosperms
- Clade: Eudicots
- Clade: Rosids
- Order: Myrtales
- Family: Myrtaceae
- Genus: Corymbia
- Species: C. clandestina

Binomial name
- Corymbia clandestina (A.R.Bean) K.D.Hill & L.A.S.Johnson

Synonyms
- Eucalyptus clandestina A.R.Bean

Species of plant

Corymbia clandestina, commonly known as Drummond Range bloodwood, is a species of small tree that is endemic to Queensland. It has rough, tessellated bark on the trunk and branches, lance-shaped adult leaves, flower buds in groups of seven, white flowers and urn-shaped to barrel-shaped fruit.

== Description ==
Corymbia clandestina is a tree that typically grows to a height of 8–10 m (26–33 ft) and forms a lignotuber. It has rough, tessellated greyish bark on the trunk and branches. Young plants and coppice regrowth have narrow lance-shaped leaves that are paler on the lower surface, 55–105 mm (2.2–4.1 in) long and 8–16 mm (0.31–0.63 in) wide tapering to a short petiole. Adult leaves are glossy dark green on the upper surface, paler below, lance-shaped, 73–120 mm (2.9–4.7 in) long and 10–20 mm (0.39–0.79 in) wide, tapering to a petiole 8–16 mm (0.31–0.63 in) long. The flower buds are arranged on the ends of branchlets on a thin, branched peduncle 5–14 mm (0.20–0.55 in) long, each branch of the peduncle with seven buds on pedicels 5–8 mm (0.20–0.31 in) long. Mature buds are oval to pear-shaped, about 8 mm (0.31 in) long and 5 mm (0.20 in) wide with a rounded to conical operculum. Flowering has been observed in February and the flowers are white. The fruit is an urn-shaped to barrel-shaped capsule 9–14 mm (0.35–0.55 in) long and 7–10 mm (0.28–0.39 in) wide with the valves enclosed in the fruit.

== Taxonomy and naming ==
This species was first formally described in 1994 by Anthony Bean who gave it the name Eucalyptus clandestina and published the description in the journal Austrobaileya from specimens he collected near Clermont on the road to Alpha in 1990. In 1995 Ken Hill and Lawrie Johnson changed the name to Corymbia clandestina. The specific epithet (clandestina) is from the Latin word clandestinus meaning "secret" or "hidden", referring to this species often being hidden amongst ironbarks. Plants of the World Online considers C. clandestina a synonym of Corymbia brachycarpa.

== Distribution and habitat ==
Corymbia clandestina is only known from a few occurrences near Clermont and Blair Athol where it often grows in woodland with Eucalyptus crebra and E. melanophloia.

== Conservation status ==
This bloodwood is classified as "vulnerable" under the Australian Government Environment Protection and Biodiversity Conservation Act 1999 and under the Queensland Government Nature Conservation Act 1992. The main threats to the species are grazing by domestic stock and by mining exploration.

== See also ==
- List of Corymbia species
