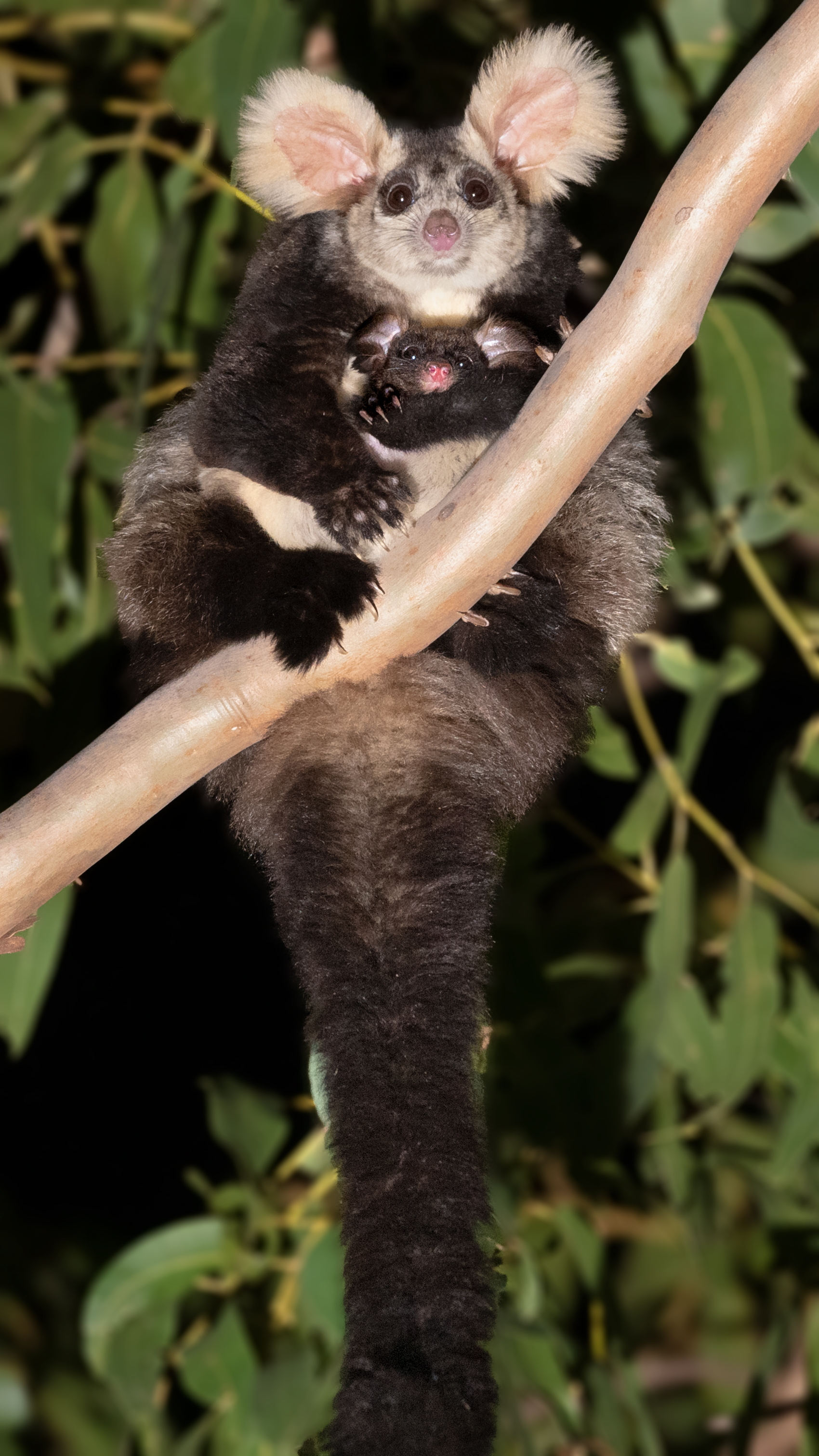

Scientific classification
- Kingdom: Animalia
- Phylum: Chordata
- Class: Mammalia
- Infraclass: Marsupialia
- Order: Diprotodontia
- Family: Pseudocheiridae
- Subfamily: Hemibelideinae
- Genus: Petauroides; Thomas, 1888

Type species
- Didelphis volans Kerr, 1792

Species
- P. armillatus; P. minor; P. volans
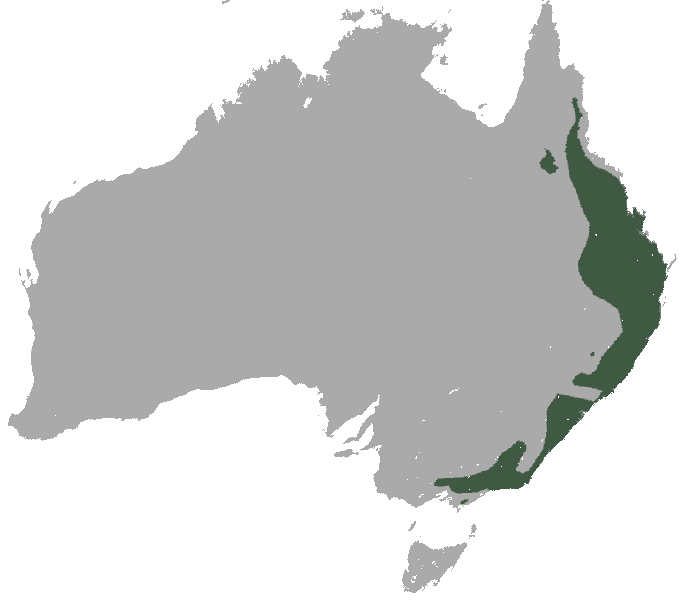
- Greater glider range

Synonyms
- Schoinobates

= Greater glider =

Genus of marsupials

The greater gliders are three species of large gliding marsupials in the genus Petauroides, all of which are found in eastern Australia. Until 2020 they were considered to be one species, Petauroides volans. In 2020 morphological and genetic differences, obtained using diversity arrays technology, showed there were three species subsumed under this one name. The two new species were named Petauroides armillatus and Petauroides minor.

These species are not closely related to the Petaurus group of gliding marsupials but instead to the Lemuroid ringtail possum, Hemibelideus lemuroides, with which it shares the subfamily Hemibelideinae.

The greater gliders are nocturnal and are solitary herbivores feeding almost exclusively on Eucalyptus leaves and buds. Like their relative, the lemur-like ringtail, the southern greater glider is found in two forms: a sooty brown form and a grey-to-white form. The central greater glider is instead silvery brown, while the northern greater glider is brownish-gray.

The greater gliders are found in eucalypt forests from Mossman, Queensland, to Daylesford, Victoria.

== Taxonomy ==
Although the genus was formerly thought to be monotypic, there are now known to be three species in the genus:

- Central greater glider (Petauroides armillatus)
- Northern greater glider (Petauroides minor)
- Southern greater glider (Petauroides volans)

The species are known to hybridize with one another near the edges of their ranges.

== Anatomy and physiology ==
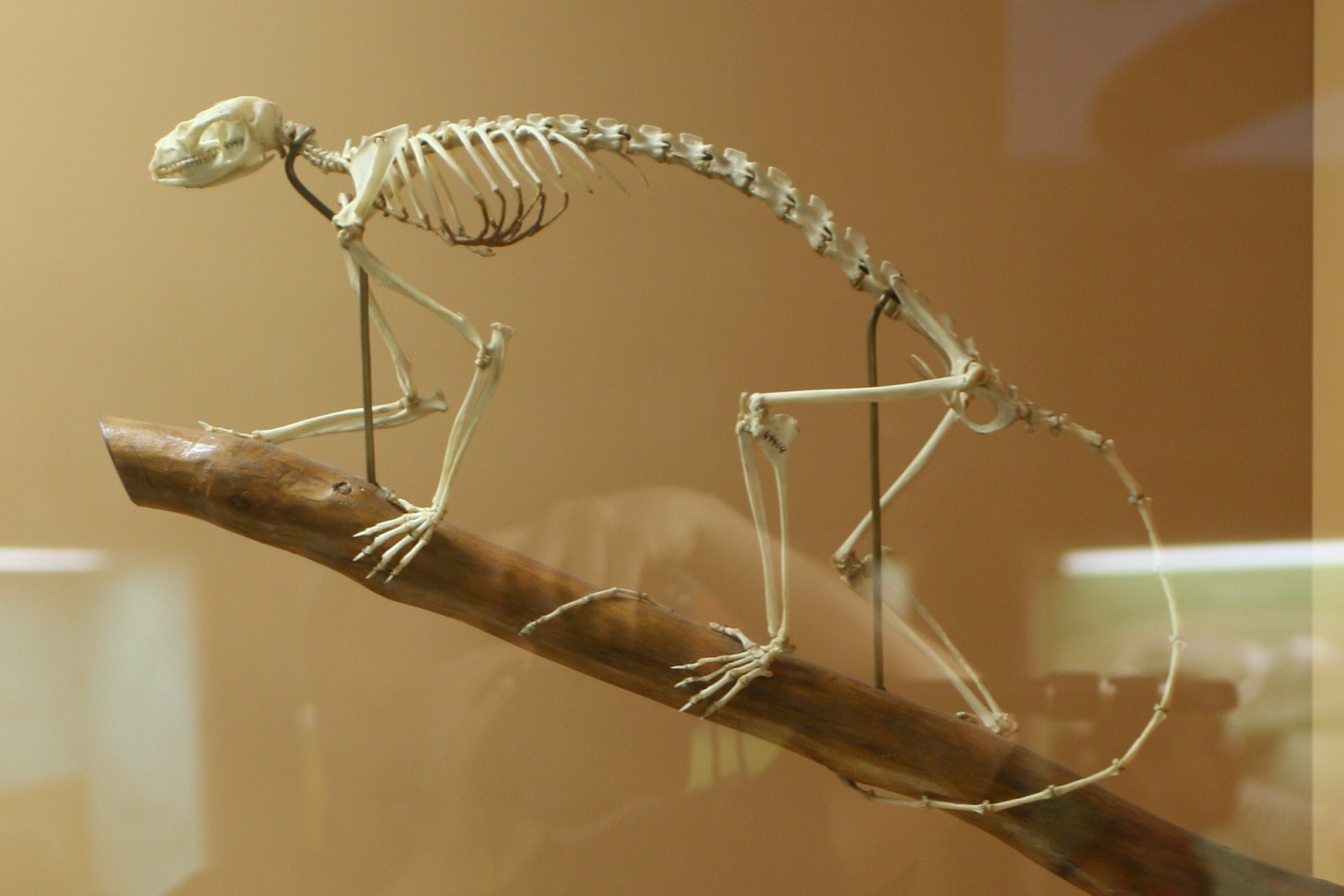
Skeleton of a greater glider

The three species differ in their size, with the northern greater glider only growing to the size of a small ringtail possum, while the southern greater glider grows to the size of a house cat. The central greater glider is intermediate between these two.

Greater gliders have a head and body 39 to 43 centimetres (15 to 17 in) long, with the females generally being larger than the males. Their body is covered with a shaggy coat of fur that increases their apparent size, and the tail is long and bushy, ranging from 44 to 53 centimetres (17 to 21 in). The head is short with a pointed muzzle and their large ears are fringed and backed with long fur.

Each side of the body bears membranes stretching between the elbow and the ankle that give these animals the ability to perform controlled glides. This is in contrast to other gliding marsupials, such as the sugar glider, that have gliding membranes stretching from the wrists to the ankles.

The feet have strongly recurved claws to grip onto bark or other surfaces. There are five toes on each foot. The first toe on the hind foot and the first two toes on the fore foot are opposable.

The fur is soft and up to 60 millimetres (2.4 in) long. All three species have cream undersides and primarily differ in the coloration of their pelages. The northern greater glider has a brownish-gray coloration, the central greater glider has a dark silvery-brown coloration with dark brown face, legs, and tail, while the southern greater glider varies between a dark, almost black morph or a pale white and gray morph. Body mass varies from 1,600 grams (3.5 lb) in the southern greater glider of Victoria to 600 grams (1.3 lb) in the northern greater glider of north Queensland.

=== Physiology ===
Heat management in the greater gliders is performed by licking extremities and the ventral body surface, and direct evaporation is the main method of cooling. They can also use their gliding membranes to reduce heat loss by increasing the layer of insulation at the skin surface. The gliders are not well equipped to handle high ambient temperatures as they inefficiently use water for evaporation via salivation despite arboreal habitats often having limited water accessibility.

These gliders can digest low nutrient foliage, specifically eucalypt leaf matter, which contains a variety of phenolic and terpenoid compounds and a high concentration of lignified fibre. These animals can digest about 50–60% of the leaf during its passage through the gut. Their guts have a specialized caecum that contains a population of bacteria that ferment food residues that remain undigested in the small intestine. For a population in a eucalypt forest near Maryborough, Queensland, it has been calculated that their daily energy intake is about 1130 kJ, which is provided by about 45 to 50 grams (0.099 to 0.110 lb) of dry matter daily.

Mature females will give birth to a single joey each year which is typically born in late autumn or early winter. The underdeveloped offspring will then spend the next four months within the pouch of the mother to suckle and develop, and will remain within the security of the pouch until nine months of age.

== Distribution and habitat ==
Greater gliders are found in southern Queensland, eastern Australia, southeastern New South Wales, and the montane forests of the Victorian central highlands. It is usually tracked via spotlighting on transects (considered to underestimate the actual population size), radio tagging and owl-call playback. In 2025, endangered Greater gliders were discovered living in the Ewingar State Forest.

The greater gliders choose habitat based on several factors, with the dominant factor being the presence of specific species of eucalypt. Distribution levels are higher in regions of montane forest containing manna gum (E. viminalis) and mountain gum (E. dalrympleana, E. obliqua). Furthermore, the presence of E. cypellocarpa appears to improve the quality of habitat for the greater gliders in forests dominated by E. obliqua. Another factor determining population density is elevation. Optimal levels are 845 m above sea level. Within a forest of suitable habitat, they prefer overstorey basal areas in old-growth tree stands.

== Behaviour ==
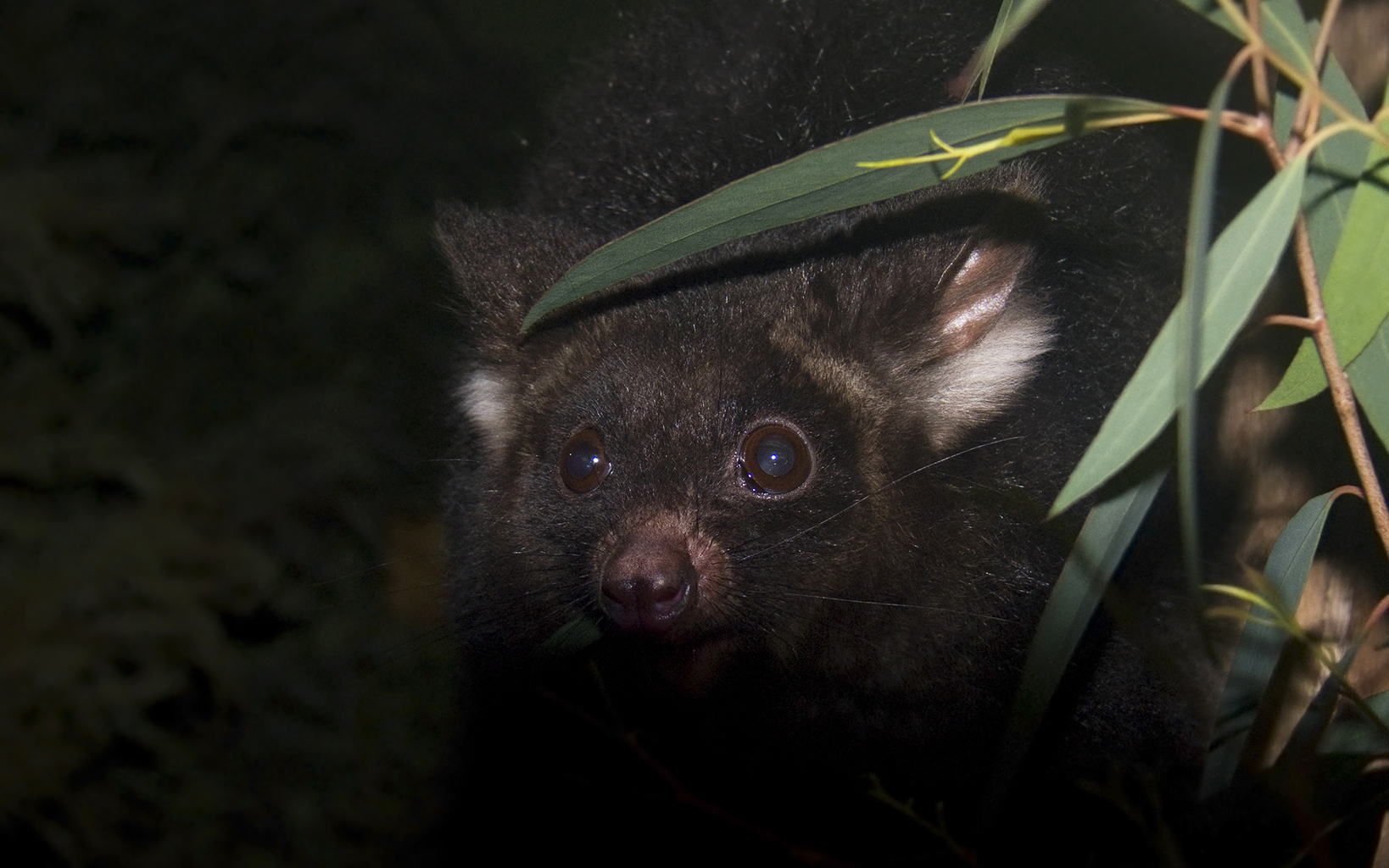
The head of a dark morph southern greater glider

The greater gliders are primarily nocturnal, spending the night foraging in the highest parts of the forest canopy. During the day, they spend most of their time denning in hollowed trees, with each animal inhabiting up to twenty different dens within its home range. The dens are often lined with leaves and strips of bark. This is why spotlighting has become a popular way of locating members of a population. When a strong light is directed at the eyes of a glider, the observer will see two bright red orbs reflecting back.

Within forests, males and females will have home territories and set borders between other individuals. For males, home territory ranges from 1.4 to 4.1 hectares (3.5 to 10.1 acres) while that of females is only 1.3 to 3.0 hectares (3.2 to 7.4 acres). Although home ranges may overlap, the animals remain generally solitary outside of the breeding season, and only rarely interact. In large and small patches of forest, the home territories will respectively be larger and smaller.

The gliding posture of the greater gliders is unique among marsupials. The forelimbs are folded so that the wrists are tucked under the chin, giving the patagium a triangular outline when outstretched. These animals regularly glide between high trees, and are able to use their tails to assist in steering. They avoid traveling along the ground whenever possible, and are slow and clumsy if forced to do so.

Greater gliders do not make any loud sounds, and are thought to communicate through scent marking. The animal's cloacal glands give it a generally musty smell.

== Ecology ==
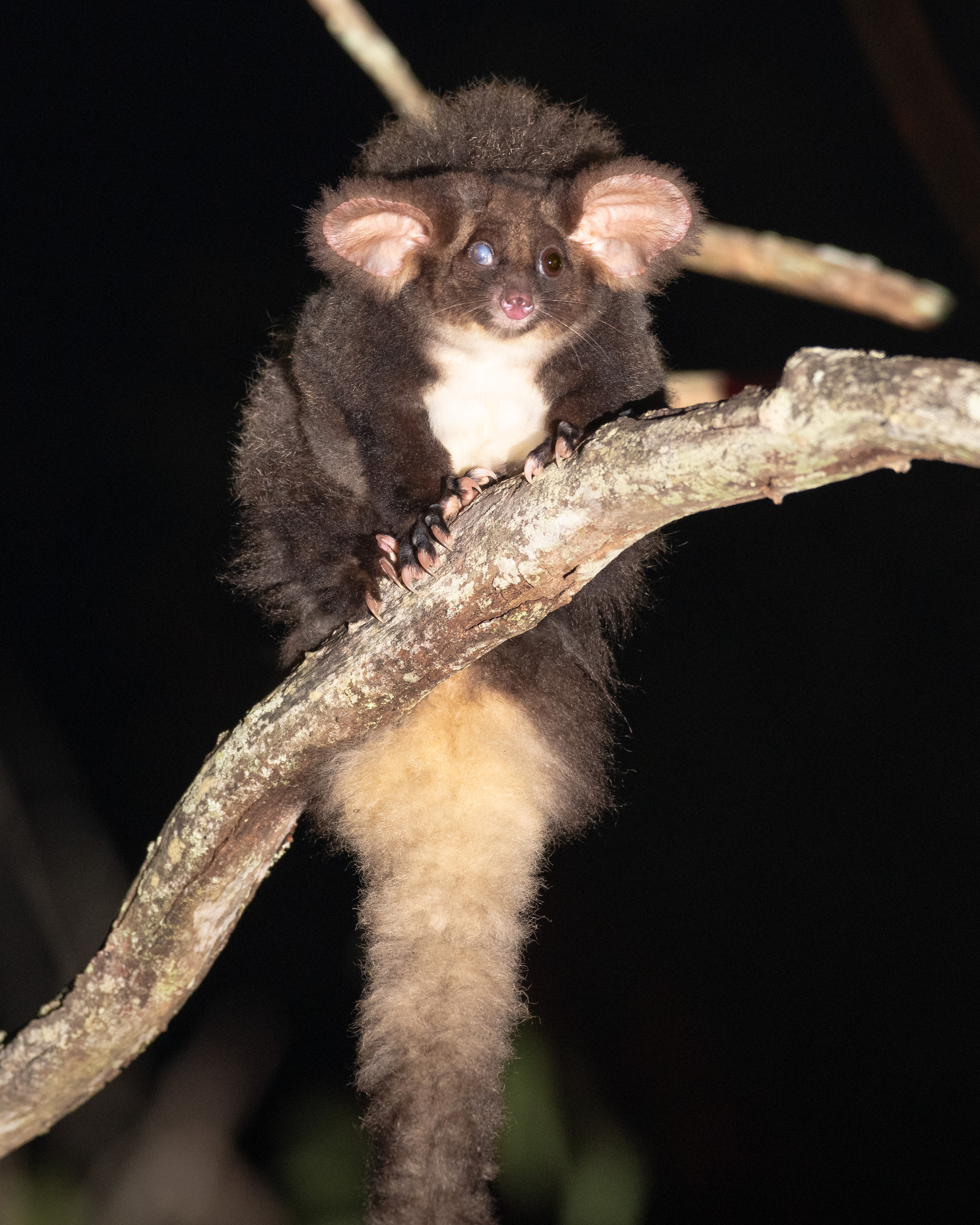

Greater gliders subsist almost entirely on the young leaves and flower buds of select eucalypt species, especially Eucalyptus radiata, Eucalyptus viminalis, and Eucalyptus acmenoides. Young leaves are preferred because they have higher concentration of protein, and lower concentration of lignocellulose which provides no nutrition. Overall, eucalypt leaves are a poor source of nutrients.

Due to its nocturnal lifestyle, a natural predator of the gliders is the Powerful Owl (Ninox strenua). It hunts by concentrating in pockets within their relatively large home range until populations of prey are depleted to a level that causes the owl to shift hunting grounds. Other predators include feral cats, introduced to Australia with the arrival of Europeans.

== Reproduction ==
The breeding season for greater gliders is relatively brief, lasting from February to May, with births occurring between April and June. Females have a relatively well-developed pouch, opening towards the forward part of the animal, and containing two teats. Only a single young is born each year.

At birth, the young weighs only around 0.27 grams (0.0095 oz), but it does not begin to leave the pouch for about four months, by which time it is already furred and well developed. After leaving the pouch, the mother may carry it about on her back until it is weaned at about seven months of age. The young are independent at nine months, and reach sexual maturity between 18 months and two years after birth.

Greater gliders have been recorded living up to fifteen years.

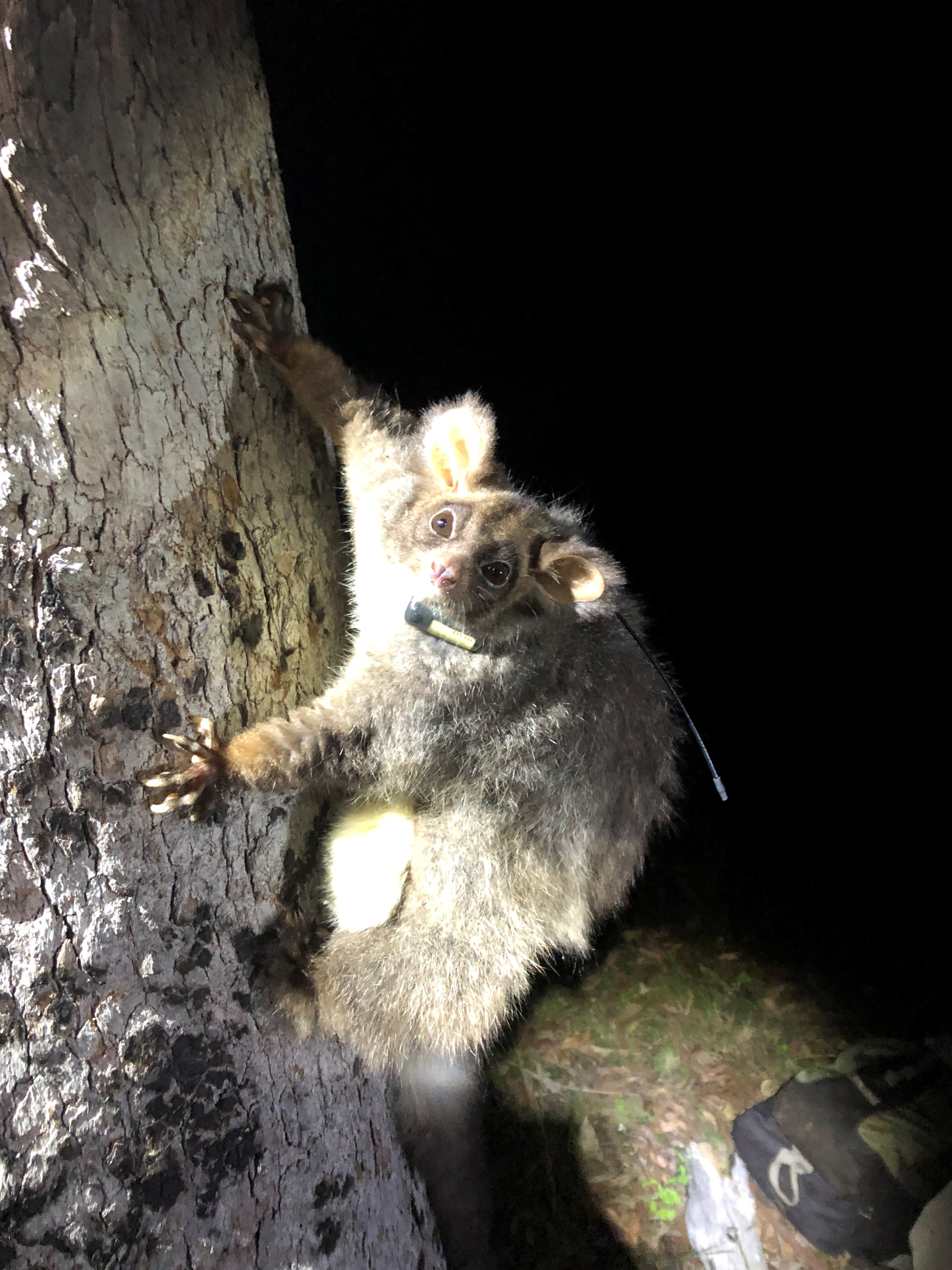
A Northern greater glider (P. minor) at Ravenshoe, Queensland

== Evolution ==
Although previously thought to be related to the other gliding possums, the greater glider genus, Petauroides, is now known to be most closely related to the ringtail possums, and especially to the lemur-like ringtail possum, from which its ancestors diverged around 18 million years ago. In contrast, it diverged from the gliding possums much earlier, around 36 million years ago. Fossils of greater gliders are known from the late Pleistocene onwards, and show that the animal was once more widespread and inhabited other areas including parts of South Australia.

== Conservation status ==
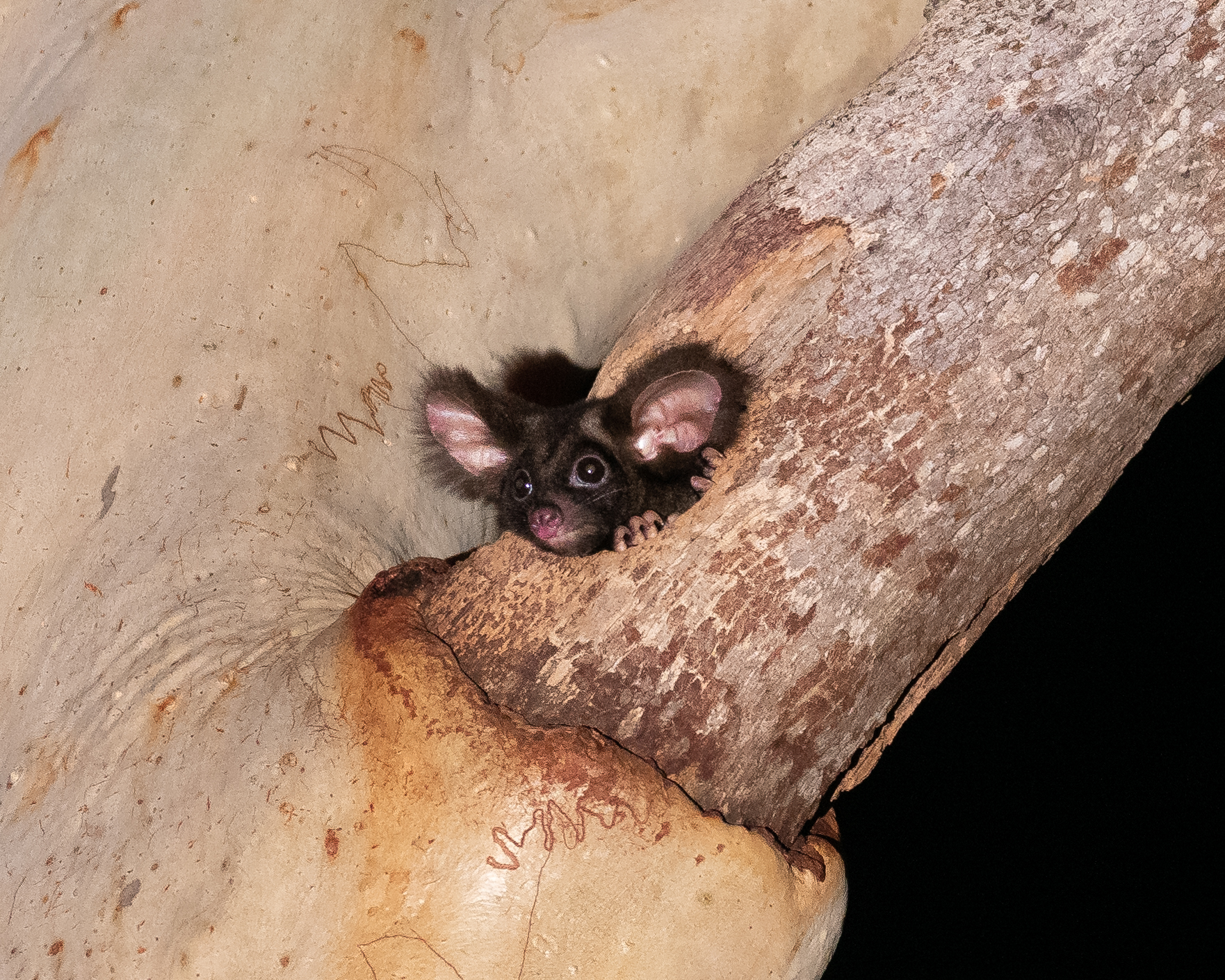

Greater gliders as a whole are listed as endangered nationally, in Queensland, New South Wales, the Australian Capital Territory and Victoria, under the EPBC Act, the Queensland Nature Conservation Act and Victorian Advisory List of Threatened Vertebrate Fauna. Given the split into three species, and the uniquely threatened status of the southern species, this may need revision.

== Bibliography ==
- Cronin, Leonard — "Key Guide to Australian Mammals", published by Reed Books Pty. Ltd., Sydney, 1991 ISBN 0-7301-0355-2
- van der Beld, John — "Nature of Australia — A portrait of the island continent", co-published by William Collins Pty. Ltd. and ABC Enterprises for the Australian Broadcasting Corporation, Sydney, 1988 (revised edition 1992), ISBN 0-7333-0241-6
- Russell, Rupert — "Spotlight on Possums", published by University of Queensland Press, St. Lucia, Queensland, 1980, ISBN 0-7022-1478-7
- Troughton, Ellis — "Furred Animals of Australia", published by Angus and Robertson (Publishers) Pty. Ltd., Sydney, in 1941 (revised edition 1973), ISBN 0-207-12256-3
- Morcombe, Michael & Irene — "Mammals of Australia", published by Australian Universities Press Pty. Ltd., Sydney, 1974, ISBN 0-7249-0017-9
- Ride, W. D. L. — "A Guide to the Native Mammals of Australia", published by Oxford University Press, Melbourne, 1970, ISBN 0 19 550252 3
- Serventy, Vincent — "Wildlife of Australia", published by Thomas Nelson (Australia) Ltd., Melbourne, 1968 (revised edition 1977), ISBN 0-17-005168-4
- Serventy, Vincent (editor) — "Australia's Wildlife Heritage", published by Paul Hamlyn Pty. Ltd., Sydney, 1975
