= Charles Bampfield Yule =

Captain Charles Bampfield Yule
- Born: 1806
- Died: 1 November 1878 (aged 71–72) Anderton, Cornwall, England
- Allegiance: United Kingdom
- Branch: Royal Navy
- Rank: Captain

Captain Charles Bampfield Yule (1806 – 1 November 1878 at Anderton, Cornwall, United Kingdom) was an explorer and author of the Admiralty Australia Directory.

The third son of Commander John Yule RN who served with Nelson at Trafalgar and a mother who was the daughter of Bampfield Carslake, Charles Bampfield Yule was the brother of the Reverend John Carslake Duncan Yule. While a Lieutenant, he commanded HMS Bramble as part of the surveying expedition led by Frances Blackwood from 1842 to 1845. Yule discovered and named Heron Island off Queensland, Australia on 11 January 1843. He continued on to survey the coast of New Guinea in 1846 and assisted Owen Stanley in his New Guinea expedition of 1848–1849. Although Yule claimed New Guinea for Great Britain, his claim was not recognised by the British government (although Great Britain was later to officially claim southeastern New Guinea in 1884). His survey work was incorporated into volumes of the Australia Directory from 1853 to 1868.

Yule Island in Papua-New Guinea is most likely named after Yule, although he did not claim credit for its discovery.

== Ranks ==
- 11 May 1830 – Entered Royal Navy
- 2 April 1842 – Lieutenant
- 18 September 1851 – Commander
- 1 October 1866 Captain

== Commands ==
- 2 April 1830 – HMS Bramble

During his command, Bramble was attached to HMS Rattlesnake during survey duties on the East Indies Station, mainly around the coast of Eastern Australia and New Guinea. Some were published in the form of sailing directions, such as that Endeavour Strait in 1845. before being compiled into The Australia Directory.

== Publications ==
- The Australia Directory

- Volume 1: South and east coasts from Cape Leeuwin to Port Jackson, including Bass Strait and Tasmania (6th ed.). 1868.
- Volume 2: The east coast from Port Jackson to Cape York, Torres Strait and approaches, the Coral Sea, and part of the Gulf of Carpentaria (1st ed.). 1859.
- Volume 3: North, north-west, and west coasts, from the Gulf of Carpentaria to Cape Leeuwin.

== See also ==
- O'Byrne, William Richard (1849). "Yule, Charles Bampfield" . A Naval Biographical Dictionary . John Murray – via Wikisource.
- European and American voyages of scientific exploration
