= Lee Hannah =

Lee Hannah is a conservation ecologist and a Senior Researcher in Climate Change Biology at Conservation International. Hannah is one of many authors who published an article predicting that between 15% and 37% of species are at risk of extinction due to climate change caused by human greenhouse gas emissions.

== Biography ==
Lee Hannah received his B.A. in Biology with High Honors in June 1978 from the University of California, Berkeley. His honors thesis at Berkeley was “Renewable Energy Potentials and Impacts". Hannah received his Doctorate in Environmental Science and Engineering from the University of California, Los Angeles in June 1985. His UCLA dissertation was “Protection of Hawaii’s Native Birds in Geothermal Energy Development,”. Since 2000, Hannah has been a Senior Researcher in Climate Change Biology at Conservation International. Since 2004, he has also been working as a visiting researcher and adjunct professor at the Bren School of Environmental Science & Management at the University of California, Santa Barbara. His classes at UCSB include Climate Change Biology, Landscape Ecology, and Conservation Planning. Hannah collaborates with the South Africa National Biodiversity Institute at Kirstenbosch (in Cape Town) to study biodiversity changes as a result of global warming.

Hannah is involved in three societies, the American Association for the Advancement of Science (AAAS), the Ecological Society of America, and the Society for Conservation Biology. He holds many honors and awards, including being a National Merit Scholar in 1974; Environmental Science and Engineering Class President in UCLA from 1981–82; the American Institute of Biological Sciences Congressional Fellow in Washington D.C. from 1986–87; and the American Association for the Advancement of Science, a Science and Diplomacy Fellow, in Washington D.C. from 1987–89.

== Work ==
Hannah's work is primarily centered on how climate change affects biodiversity. He uses that research to see how climate change is affecting conservation efforts. Because of his work, he infers climate change needs to be strongly considered when planning conservation. Lee Hannah strongly supports creating protected areas such as parks and reserves. He is also an advocate of habitat corridors and believes they are necessary for the survival of animals. Hannah argues that each species have a certain tolerable range of temperature that they can handle. If a certain area that once was hospitable to the species becomes unsuitable, the species will migrate to a cooler area. Thus, habitat connectivity is needed so that plants and animals will be able to move to find suitable climatic conditions Finally, Hannah supports lowering greenhouse gas emissions.

One of Hannah's most notable publications was in the January 2004 edition of Nature. In the article, Extinction risk from climate change, Hannah and his coauthors attempt to predict how biodiversity will be affected by climate change. The study was done by computer simulations and based on the ecological law of the species-area curve, which amounts to the bigger the piece of livable land, the more species it harbors. The paper concluded that as a result of climate changes that will take place from now till 2050, between 15% and 37% of species will be on a path to extinction. Thus, all of those species will not be extinct by 2050, but they will be committed to extinction by human greenhouse gas pollution that occurs in that timeframe. The conclusions of the study are therefore based on the assumption that climate change will continue at approximately its current pace. If international policy action results in climate change starting to level-off, it would reduce the number of extinctions projected by the study. Critics of the study point to the all-computer simulation, saying too many unknowns in computers give skewed results. Likewise, some believe that just because living area shrinks, it is not necessarily indicative of the exact number of species that will go extinct. Other critics point to the fact that plants and animals are able to adapt, and though there will be an impact on life, there will not be as great an impact as this study predicts.

Hannah co-edited Climate Change and Biodiversity with Thomas Lovejoy on climate change (Yale University Press 2005). It was honored by Choice magazine as one of the “Outstanding Academic Titles” in 2005.

Hannah authored the first undergraduate textbook on climate change and biological systems, Climate Change Biology (Elsevier 2010). He has authored over 50 papers on climate change and nature conservation.

== Publications ==
- Cross, M., E. Zavaleta, D. Bachelet, M. Brooks, C. Enquist, E. Fleishman, L. Graumlich, C. Groves, L. Hannah, and G. Tabor. "A Climate Change Adaptation Framework for Natural Resource Conservation and Management. Conservation Letters (In review).
- Hannah, L., Midgley, G., Andelman, S., Araujo, M., Martinez-Meyer, E., Pearson, R. and Williams, P. (2007) Protected Area Needs in a Changing Climate. Frontiers in Ecology and the Environment (in proof).
- Hannah, L.; Midgley, G.; Hughes, G.; Bomhard, B. (2005). "The view from the Cape: Extinction risk, protected areas and climate change". BioScience. 55 (3): 231–242. doi:10.1641/0006-3568(2005)055[0231:tvftce]2.0.co;2.
- Lovejoy, T. and Hannah, L. (Eds) (2005). Climate Change and Biodiversity. New Haven: Yale. 398pp
- Hannah, L.; Philips, B. (2004). "Extinction Risk coverage is worth reporting inaccuracies". Nature. 430 (6996): 141. doi:10.1038/430141a. PMID 15241386.
- Thomas, C. D.; Cameron, A.; Green, R. E.; Bakkenes, M.; Beaumont, L. J.; Collingham, Y. C.; Erasmus, B. F. N.; de Siqueira, M. Ferreira; Grainger, A.; Hannah, L.; Hughes, L.; Huntley, B.; Jaarsveld, A. S. Van; Midgely, G. E.; Miles, L.; Ortega-Huerta, M. A.; Peterson, A. T.; Phillips, O. L.; Williams, S. E. (2004). "Extinction risk from climate change" (PDF). Nature. 427 (6970): 145–148. Bibcode:2004Natur.427..145T. doi:10.1038/nature02121. PMID 14712274. S2CID 969382.
- Thomas, C. D.; Williams, S. E.; Cameron, A.; et al. (2004b). "Thomas et al. reply". Nature. 430: 1–2.
- Hannah, L.; Lovejoy, T; Midgley, G.; Bond, W.; Bush, M.; Lovett, J.; Scott, D.; Woodward, I. (2002). "Conservation of Biodiversity in a Changing Climate". Conservation Biology. 16 (1): 264–8. Bibcode:2002ConBi..16..264H. doi:10.1046/j.1523-1739.2002.00465.x. PMID 35701969. S2CID 85182475.
- Midgley, G.F.; Hannah, L.; Roberts, R.; Allsopp, J.; McDonald, D.J. (2001). "Quaternary climatic oscillations as a driving force behind plant species richness in the greater Cape Mediterranean Region". Journal of Mediterranean Ecology. 2: 137–145.
- Hannah, L. 2001. The role of global protected areas in conserving biodiversity during climate change. In: Climate Change and Protected Areas Visconti, G. (ed). Kluwer: Amsterdam.
- Brooks, T., Hannah, L., da Fonseca, G. A. B. and Mittermeier, R. A. 2001. Prioritizing hotspots, representing transitions. Trends in Ecology & Evolution. 16, 673.
- Hannah, L. 2001. World wilderness - Global assessments and prospects for the future. In: Wilderness and Humanity Martin, V. and Sarathy, M. (Eds). pp 14–20. Fulcrum: Golden, Colorado.
- Fonseca, G.;Balmford, A.;Bibby, C.;Boitani, L.;Corsi, F.;Brooks, T.;Gascon, C.;Olivieri, S.;Mittermeier, R.;Burgess, N.;Dinerstein, E.;Olson, D.;Hannah, L.;Lovett, J.;Moyer, D.;Rahbek, C.;Stuart, S.;Williams, P.; (2000) Following Africa's Lead in Setting Priorities Nature : 405 393-394
- Mittermeier, R. A.;Myers, N.;Mittermeier, C. G.;Gil, P. R.;Fonseca, G. A. B.;Konstant, W. R.;Mast, R. B.;Thomsen, J. B.;Bowles, I. A.;Olivieri, S.;Ayres, J. M.;Hannah, L.; (1999) Hotspots and Global Biodiversity Conservation. In: Mittermeier, R. A., N. Myers, P. R. Gil, and C. G. Mittermeier (eds.), Hotspots: Earth's Biologically Richest and Most Endangered Terrestrial Ecoregions, pp. 21–67 CEMEX
- Hannah, L.; Rakotosamimanana, B.; Ganzhorn, J.; Mittermeier, R. A.; Olivieri, S.; Iyer, L.; Rajaobelina, S.; Hough, J.; Andriamialisoa, F.; Bowles, I.; Tilkin, G. (1998). "Participatory Planning, Scientific Priorities and Landscape Conservation in Madagascar". Environmental Conservation. 25 (1): 30–36. Bibcode:1998EnvCo..25...30H. doi:10.1017/s0376892998000071. S2CID 84188190.
- Ganzhorn, J., B. Rakotosamimanana, L. Hannah, J. Hough, L. Iyer, S. Olivieri, S. Rajaobelina, and G. Tilken. 1997. Priorities for Biodiversity Conservation in Madagascar. Primate Report (special issue) 48–1.
- Slaymaker, D. M. and L. Hannah. 1997. GPS-Logged Aerial Video as a Georeferencing Tool for Digital Imagery in Remote Regions, A Case Study in Madagascar. In: Proceedings of the 16th Biannual Workshop on Color Photography and Videography in Resource Assessment.
- Hannah, L.; Mittermeier, R. A.; Ross, K.; Castro, H.; Castro, F. (1997). "New Threats to the Okavango Delta of Botswana". Oryx. 31 (2): 86–89. doi:10.1017/S0030605300021979.
- Hannah, L.; Carr, J. L.; Lankerani, A. (1995). "Human Disturbance and Natural Habitat: A Biome Level Analysis of a Global Data Set". Biodiversity and Conservation. 4 (2): 128–155. Bibcode:1995BiCon...4..128H. doi:10.1007/bf00137781. S2CID 9654259.
- Hannah, L.; Lohse, D.; Hutchinson, C.; Carr, J.L. (1994). "A Preliminary Inventory of Human Disturbance of World Ecosystems". Ambio. 23 (4–5): 246.
- Hannah, L. 1992. “African People, African Parks: An Evaluation of Development Initiatives as a Means of Improving Protected Area Conservation in Africa.” Agency for International Development, Bureau for Africa, Biodiversity Support Program and Conservation International.
- Wells, M., K. Brandon and L. Hannah. 1992. People and Parks: Linking Protected Area Conservation to Local Development. World Bank.
- Hannah, L (1990). "Rain-Forests and Geothermal Energy in Hawaii: Environmental Concerns Expose Flawed Planning Process". Environmental Conservation. 17 (3): 239. doi:10.1017/s0376892900032380. S2CID 85575903.
- Hannah, L., G. Wetterberg, and L. Duvall. 1988. “Botswana Biological Diversity Assessment.” Agency for International Development, Bureau for Africa. Technical Report 698-046788-1.
- Hannah, L (1987). "Endangered Species Act Faces Challenges in 100th Congress". BioScience. 37 (1): 16. doi:10.1093/bioscience/37.1.16.
- Hannah, L (1987). "Environmental Changes Underway at the World Bank". BioScience. 37 (3): 186. doi:10.2307/1310516. JSTOR 1310516.
- Hannah, L. 1987. Valuing Wildlife: Challenges for the Future. (book review) The Environmental Professional 8(2):36.
- Hannah, L (1986). "Protection of Hawaii's Native Wildlife During Geothermal Energy Development". Environmental Management. 10 (5): 611–621. doi:10.1007/bf01866765. S2CID 155062960.
- Hannah, L (1986). "An Assessment of Native Wildlife Values for Geothermal Energy Siting in Hawaii". The Environmental Professional. 8 (1): 21.
- Kratzer, C.; Hannah, L.; Broutman, M. (1985). "Predicting Impacts from Water Conservation and Energy Development on the Salton Sea, California". Water Resources Bulletin. 21 (4): 565–572. Bibcode:1985JAWRA..21..565K. doi:10.1111/j.1752-1688.1985.tb05371.x.
- Hannah, L. 1984. “Land Use Strategies in Wind Energy Development.” presented paper, AAAS Pacific Division Regional Meetings, San Francisco, CA June 10.
- Hannah, L. 1984. “Economics of Wind Energy Development.” presented paper, AAAS Pacific Division Regional Meetings, San Francisco, CA June 12.
- Lindberg, R., P. Merifield, F. Turner, L. Hannah. 1982. “Resource Use and Wildlife Issues in Development of Alternative Energy Technologies in the Southern California Desert.” UCLA/Southern California Edison Report 82–44.
