= HMS Bramble (1822) =

Cutter of the Royal Navy

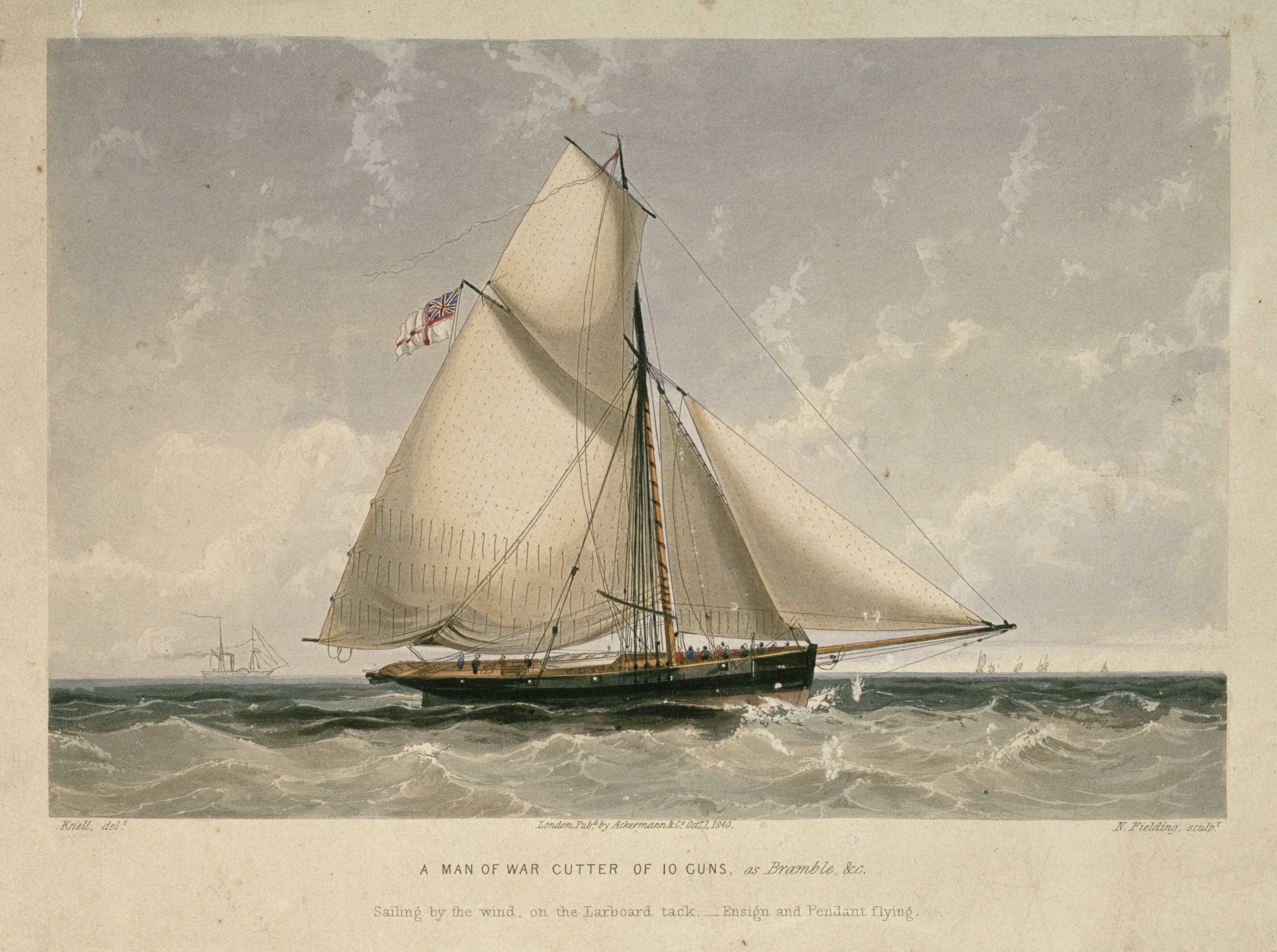
- HMS Bramble

History

United Kingdom
- Name: HMS Bramble
- Ordered: 20 March 1819
- Builder: Plymouth Dockyard
- Laid down: August 1820
- Launched: 8 April 1822
- Commissioned: 21 June 1824
- Decommissioned: 1876
- Fate: Sold as a lightship, 23 December 1876

General characteristics
- Class & type: Bramble-class cutter
- Tons burthen: 161 bm
- Length: 70 ft 9 in (21.6 m)
- Beam: 26 ft (7.9 m)
- Draught: 10 ft 3 in (3.1 m)
- Sail plan: Fore-and-aft rig
- Armament: 10 guns

HMS Bramble was a 161-ton, 10-gun cutter launched on 8 April 1822 from Plymouth Dockyard.

== Naval career ==
She operated from April 1842 to April 1847, under the command of Lieutenant Charles Bampfield Yule as a tender to HMS Fly. In the East Indies Station she undertook surveys around Australia. After April 1847, still commanded by Charles Yule as a tender to HMS Rattlesnake, she undertook surveys and explored the southern part of New Guinea and the Louisiade Archipelago.

Between 1855 and 1859 she was assigned as a tender to HMS Calliope undertaking survey work around Australia and also for diving operations at Sydney. Bramble was then assigned to the Australia Station in 1859 before being decommissioned in 1876.

== Civilian career ==
She was sold as a lightship and was anchored at Sow and Pigs reef situated just on the eastern side of the channel between Middle Head and South Head, Sydney Harbour. She was purchased by Colonial Sugar Refining Co. and was fitted out as a lighter. In 1938, during the Sesquicentennial celebrations, she was chartered to the Maritime Services Board, who made the vessel into a replica of the historic HMS Supply. Afterwards she was reconverted into a lighter and was known as Registered lighter No. 79.

== See also ==
- European and American voyages of scientific exploration
