= List of phalangeriformes =

Species in mammal suborder Phalangeriformes

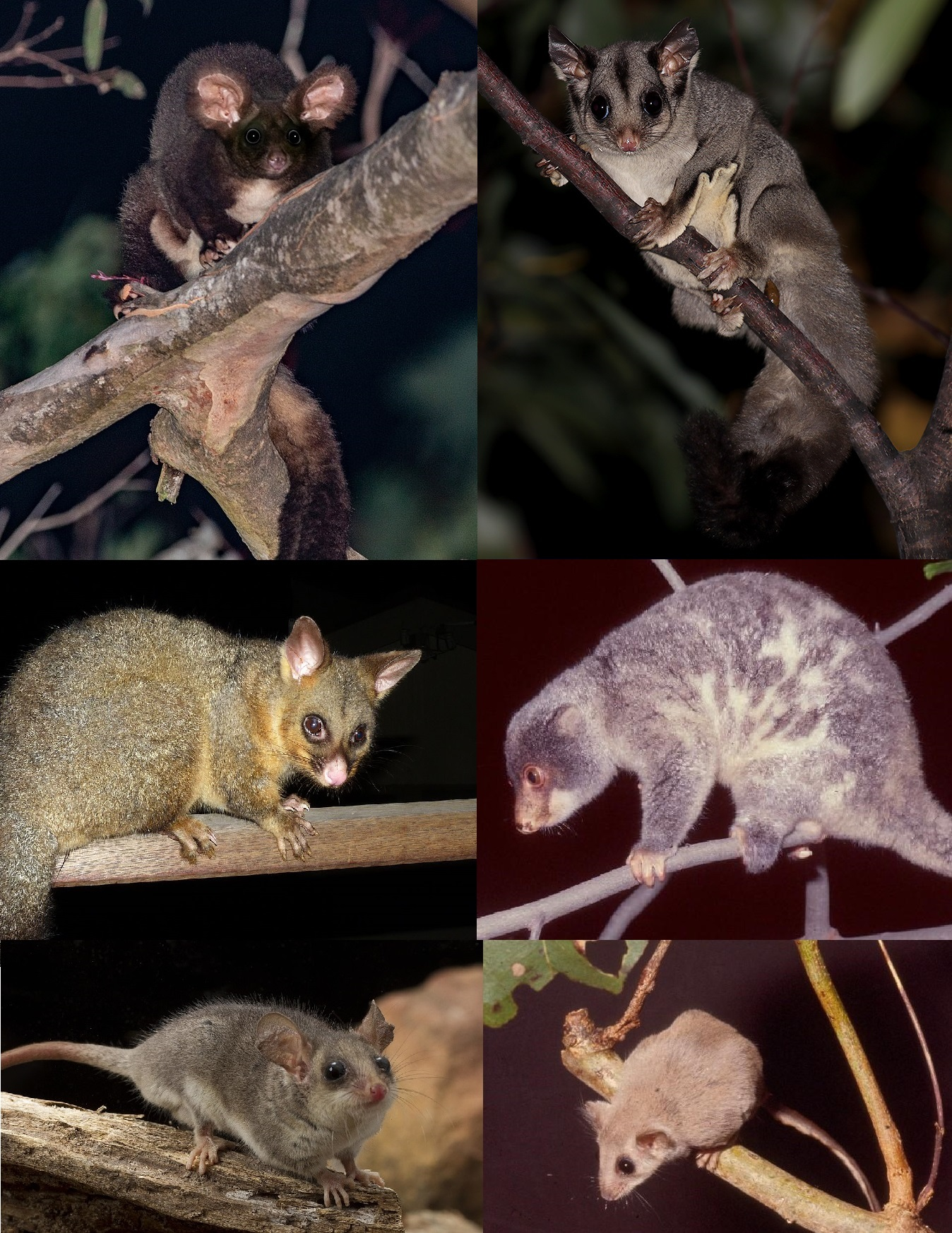
Six species of phalangeriformes, clockwise from the top left: greater glider (Petauroides volans), sugar glider (Petaurus breviceps), common spotted cuscus (Spilocuscus maculatus), feathertail glider (Acrobates pygmaeus), eastern pygmy possum (Cercartetus nanus), and common brushtail possum (Trichosurus vulpecula)

Phalangeriformes is a suborder of Australian marsupial mammals. Members of this suborder are called phalangeriformes, and include possums, gliders, and cuscus. Phalangeriformes is one of three suborders that form the order Diprotodontia, the largest extant order of marsupials. They are found in Australia, New Guinea, and Indonesia, generally in forests, though some species can also be found in shrublands and grasslands. They range in size from the Tasmanian pygmy possum, at 5 cm (2 in) plus a 6 cm (2 in) tail, to the cuscus of the genus Spilocuscus, at 64 cm (25 in) plus a 59 cm (23 in) tail. Phalangeriformes primarily eat leaves, fruit, and insects, though many are omnivorous and will eat small vertebrates or other plant material.

Many phalangeriformes do not have population estimates, but the ones that do range from 50 mature individuals to 75,000. No species have gone extinct in modern times, but five are categorized as endangered: the southern greater glider, Tate's triok, mahogany glider, Gebe cuscus, and Woodlark cuscus. A further eight species are categorized as critically endangered: Leadbeater's possum, northern glider, western ringtail possum, mountain pygmy possum, Talaud bear cuscus, Telefomin cuscus, black-spotted cuscus, and blue-eyed spotted cuscus.

The sixty-four extant species of Phalangeriformes are divided into six families grouped into two superfamilies: Petauroidea, containing two species in two genera in the family Acrobatidae, eleven in three genera in the family Petauridae, eighteen in six genera in the family Pseudocheiridae, and a single species in the family Tarsipedidae; and Phalangeroidea, containing five species in two genera in the family Burramyidae and twenty-seven in five genera in the family Phalangeridae. Several extinct Phalangeriformes species have been discovered, though due to ongoing research and discoveries the exact number and categorization is not fixed.

== Conventions ==
IUCN Red List categories
Conservation status
- EX: Extinct (0 species)
- EW: Extinct in the wild (0 species)
- CR: Critically endangered (8 species)
- EN: Endangered (5 species)
- VU: Vulnerable (6 species)
- NT: Near threatened (8 species)
- LC: Least concern (36 species)

Other categories
- DD: Data deficient (0 species)
- NE: Not evaluated (1 species)

The author citation for the species or genus is given after the scientific name; parentheses around the author citation indicate that this was not the original taxonomic placement. Conservation status codes listed follow the International Union for Conservation of Nature (IUCN) Red List of Threatened Species. Range maps are provided wherever possible; if a range map is not available, a description of the phalangeriformes's range is provided. Ranges are based on the IUCN Red List for that species unless otherwise noted.

== Classification ==
The suborder Phalangeriformes consists of six extant families grouped into two superfamilies: Acrobatidae, Petauridae, Pseudocheiridae, and Tarsipedidae in the superfamily Petauroidea, and Burramyidae and Phalangeridae in the superfamily Phalangeroidea. Acrobatidae contains two species in two genera, Petauridae contains eleven species in three genera, Pseudocheiridae contains eighteen species in six genera, Tarsipedidae contains a single species, Burramyidae contains five species in two genera, and Phalangeridae contains twenty-seven species in five genera.

Superfamily Petauroidea

- Family Acrobatidae
  - Genus Acrobates (feathertail glider): one species
  - Genus Distoechurus (feather-tailed possum): one species
- Family Petauridae
  - Genus Dactylopsila (trioks): four species
  - Genus Gymnobelideus (Leadbeater's possum): one species
  - Genus Petaurus (gliders): six species
- Family Pseudocheiridae
  - Subfamily Hemibelideinae
    - Genus Hemibelideus (lemuroid ringtail possum): one species
    - Genus Petauroides (southern greater glider): one species
  - Subfamily Pseudocheirinae
    - Genus Petropseudes (rock-haunting ringtail possum): one species
    - Genus Pseudocheirus (ringtail possums): two species
    - Genus Pseudochirulus (ringtail possums): eight species
  - Subfamily Pseudochiropsinae
    - Genus Pseudochirops (ringtail possums): five species
- Family Tarsipedidae
  - Genus Tarsipes (honey possum): one species

Superfamily Phalangeroidea

- Family Burramyidae
  - Genus Burramys (mountain pygmy possum): one species
  - Genus Cercartetus (pygmy possums): four species
- Family Phalangeridae
  - Subfamily Ailuropinae
    - Genus Ailurops (bear cuscus): two species
  - Subfamily Phalangerinae
    - Genus Phalanger (cuscus): thirteen species
    - Genus Spilocuscus (spotted cuscus): five species
    - Genus Strigocuscus (cuscus): two species
    - Genus Trichosurus (brushtail possums): four species
    - Genus Wyulda (scaly-tailed possum): one species

- Phalangeriformes
  - Phalangeroidea
    - Burramyidae
      - Burramys
      - Cercartetus
    - Phalangeridae
      - - Trichosurus
        - Wyulda
      - - Ailurops
        - Phalanger
        - Spilocuscus
        - Strigocuscus
  - Petauroidea
    - - - Acrobatidae
          - Acrobates
          - Distoechurus
    - - - Tarsipedidae
          Tarsipes
      - - Petauridae
          - Petaurus
          - - Dactylopsila
            - Gymnobelideus
        - Pseudocheiridae
          - - Petropseudes
            - Pseudochirops
          - - - Hemibelideus
              - Petauroides
            - - Pseudocheirus
              - Pseudochirulus

== Phalangeriformes ==
The following classification is based on the taxonomy described by the reference work Mammal Species of the World (2005), with augmentation by generally accepted proposals made since using molecular phylogenetic analysis, as supported by both the IUCN and the American Society of Mammalogists.

=== Superfamily Petauroidea ===
==== Acrobatidae ====
Genus Acrobates – Desmarest, 1818 – one species
| Common name | Scientific name and subspecies | Range | Size and ecology | IUCN status and estimated population |
|---|---|---|---|---|
| Feathertail glider | A. pygmaeus (Shaw, 1793) | Eastern Australia | Size: 6–8 cm (2–3 in) long, plus 7–8 cm (3 in) tail Habitat: Forest Diet: Honeydew and arthropods | LC Unknown |

Genus Distoechurus – Peters, 1874 – one species
| Common name | Scientific name and subspecies | Range | Size and ecology | IUCN status and estimated population |
|---|---|---|---|---|
| Feather-tailed possum | D. pennatus (Peters, 1874) | New Guinea | Size: 10–12 cm (4–5 in) long, plus 6–12 cm (2–5 in) tail Habitat: Forest Diet: Nectar, pollen, insects, and soft fruit | LC Unknown |

==== Petauridae ====
Genus Dactylopsila – Gray, 1858 – four species
| Common name | Scientific name and subspecies | Range | Size and ecology | IUCN status and estimated population |
|---|---|---|---|---|
| Great-tailed triok | D. megalura Rothschild & Dollman, 1932 | Central New Guinea | Size: 17–32 cm (7–13 in) long, plus 16–40 cm (6–16 in) tail Habitat: Forest Diet: Insects, fruit, and leaves | LC Unknown |
| Long-fingered triok | D. palpator H. Milne-Edwards, 1888 | Central New Guinea | Size: 17–32 cm (7–13 in) long, plus 16–40 cm (6–16 in) tail Habitat: Forest Diet: Insects, fruit, and leaves | LC Unknown |
| Striped possum | D. trivirgata Gray, 1858 Four subspecies: D. t. kataui; D. t. melampus; D. t. picata; D. t. trivirgata | New Guinea and northeastern Australia | Size: 17–32 cm (7–13 in) long, plus 16–40 cm (6–16 in) tail Habitat: Forest Diet: Ants, termites, and larvae | LC Unknown |
| Tate's triok | D. tatei Laurie, 1952 | Eastern New Guinea | Size: 17–32 cm (7–13 in) long, plus 16–40 cm (6–16 in) tail Habitat: Forest Diet: Insects, fruit, and leaves | EN Unknown |

Genus Gymnobelideus – McCoy, 1867 – one species
| Common name | Scientific name and subspecies | Range | Size and ecology | IUCN status and estimated population |
|---|---|---|---|---|
| Leadbeater's possum | G. leadbeateri McCoy, 1867 | Southern Australia | Size: 15–17 cm (6–7 in) long, plus 14–18 cm (6–7 in) tail Habitat: Forest Diet: Insects, spiders, and sap | CR 1,100–11,000 |

Genus Petaurus – Shaw, 1791 – six species
| Common name | Scientific name and subspecies | Range | Size and ecology | IUCN status and estimated population |
|---|---|---|---|---|
| Biak glider | P. biacensis Ulmer, 1940 | Northwestern New Guinea | Size: 12–32 cm (5–13 in) long, plus 15–48 cm (6–19 in) tail Habitat: Forest Diet: Sap, flowers, nectar, pollen, insects, arachnids, and small vertebrates | LC Unknown |
| Mahogany glider | P. gracilis (Vis, 1883) | Northeastern Australia | Size: 12–32 cm (5–13 in) long, plus 15–48 cm (6–19 in) tail Habitat: Forest Diet: Nectar and pollen, as well as insects | EN Unknown |
| Northern glider | P. abidi Ziegler, 1981 | Northern New Guinea | Size: 12–32 cm (5–13 in) long, plus 15–48 cm (6–19 in) tail Habitat: Forest Diet: Sap, flowers, nectar, pollen, insects, arachnids, and small vertebrates | CR Unknown |
| Squirrel glider | P. norfolcensis (Kerr, 1792) | Eastern Australia | Size: 12–32 cm (5–13 in) long, plus 15–48 cm (6–19 in) tail Habitat: Forest Diet: Insects, gum, sap, nectar, pollen, and seeds | LC Unknown |
| Sugar glider | P. breviceps Waterhouse, 1839 Four subspecies: P. b. ariel (Savanna glider); P. b. breviceps; P. b. longicaudatus; P. b. papuanus | New Guinea and northern, eastern, and southern Australia (introduced in pink) | Size: 12–32 cm (5–13 in) long, plus 15–48 cm (6–19 in) tail Habitat: Forest and savanna Diet: Sap, pollen, nectar, insects, arachnids, and small vertebrates | LC Unknown |
| Yellow-bellied glider | P. australis Shaw, 1791 Two subspecies: P. a. australis; P. a. reginae | Eastern Australia | Size: 27–30 cm (11–12 in) long, plus 42–48 cm (17–19 in) tail Habitat: Forest Diet: Nectar, pollen, and sap, as well as insects, arachnids, grubs, and small vertebrates | VU 10,000–100,000 |

==== Pseudocheiridae ====
===== Subfamily Hemibelideinae =====
Genus Hemibelideus – Collett, 1884 – one species
| Common name | Scientific name and subspecies | Range | Size and ecology | IUCN status and estimated population |
|---|---|---|---|---|
| Lemuroid ringtail possum | H. lemuroides (Collett, 1884) | Northeastern Australia | Size: 30–38 cm (12–15 in) long, plus 30–35 cm (12–14 in) tail Habitat: Forest Diet: Leaves | NT Unknown |

Genus Petauroides – Thomas, 1888 – one species
| Common name | Scientific name and subspecies | Range | Size and ecology | IUCN status and estimated population |
|---|---|---|---|---|
| Southern greater glider | P. volans (Kerr, 1792) Two subspecies: P. v. minor; P. v. volans | Southeastern Australia | Size: 30–48 cm (12–19 in) long, plus 45–55 cm (18–22 in) tail Habitat: Forest Diet: Eucalyptus leaves | EN 100,000–500,000 |

===== Subfamily Pseudocheirinae =====
Genus Petropseudes – Thomas, 1923 – one species
| Common name | Scientific name and subspecies | Range | Size and ecology | IUCN status and estimated population |
|---|---|---|---|---|
| Rock-haunting ringtail possum | P. dahli (Collett, 1895) | Northern Australia | Size: 33–38 cm (13–15 in) long, plus 20–27 cm (8–11 in) tail Habitat: Rocky areas Diet: Leaves, fruit, and flowers, as well as termites | LC Unknown |

Genus Pseudocheirus – Ogilby, 1837 – two species
| Common name | Scientific name and subspecies | Range | Size and ecology | IUCN status and estimated population |
|---|---|---|---|---|
| Common ringtail possum | P. peregrinus (Boddaert, 1785) Three subspecies: P. p. convolutor (Eastern ringtail possum); P. p. peregrinus (Common ringtail possum); P. p. pulcher (Rufous ringtail possum) | Eastern and southern Australia | Size: 30–35 cm (12–14 in) long, plus 30–35 cm (12–14 in) tail Habitat: Forest and savanna Diet: Eucalyptus leaves, as well as flowers, buds, nectar, and fruit | LC Unknown |
| Western ringtail possum | P. occidentalis (Thomas, 1888) | Southwestern Australia | Size: 28–40 cm (11–16 in) long, plus 28–36 cm (11–14 in) tail Habitat: Forest and savanna Diet: Leaves, as well as fruit, flowers, bark, and sap | CR 3,400 |

Genus Pseudochirulus – Matschie, 1915 – eight species
| Common name | Scientific name and subspecies | Range | Size and ecology | IUCN status and estimated population |
|---|---|---|---|---|
| Daintree River ringtail possum | P. cinereus Tate, 1945 | Northeastern Australia | Size: 16–40 cm (6–16 in) long, plus 15–47 cm (6–19 in) tail Habitat: Forest Diet: Leaves and fruit | NT 20,000–100,000 |
| Herbert River ringtail possum | P. herbertensis (Collett, 1884) | Northeastern Australia | Size: 30–40 cm (12–16 in) long, plus 29–47 cm (11–19 in) tail Habitat: Forest Diet: Leaves | LC Unknown |
| Lowland ringtail possum | P. canescens (Waterhouse, 1846) Five subspecies: P. c. avarus; P. c. bernsteini; P. c. canescens; P. c. dammermani; P. c. gyrator | New Guinea | Size: 16–40 cm (6–16 in) long, plus 15–47 cm (6–19 in) tail Habitat: Forest Diet: Leaves and fruit | LC Unknown |
| Masked ringtail possum | P. larvatus (Rothschild, 1911) | Eastern New Guinea | Size: 16–40 cm (6–16 in) long, plus 15–47 cm (6–19 in) tail Habitat: Forest Diet: Leaves and fruit | LC Unknown |
| Painted ringtail possum | P. forbesi (Thomas, 1887) | Eastern New Guinea | Size: 16–40 cm (6–16 in) long, plus 15–47 cm (6–19 in) tail Habitat: Forest Diet: Leaves and fruit | LC Unknown |
| Pygmy ringtail possum | P. mayeri (Rothschild & Dollman, 1932) | Central New Guinea | Size: 16–40 cm (6–16 in) long, plus 15–47 cm (6–19 in) tail Habitat: Forest Diet: Leaves, ferns, pollen, fungus, moss, and lichens | LC Unknown |
| Vogelkop ringtail possum | P. schlegeli (Jentink, 1884) | Western New Guinea | Size: 16–40 cm (6–16 in) long, plus 15–47 cm (6–19 in) tail Habitat: Forest Diet: Leaves and fruit | VU Unknown |
| Weyland ringtail possum | P. caroli Thomas, 1921 Two subspecies: P. c. caroli; P. c. versteegi | Western New Guinea | Size: 16–40 cm (6–16 in) long, plus 15–47 cm (6–19 in) tail Habitat: Forest Diet: Leaves and fruit | LC Unknown |

===== Subfamily Pseudochiropsinae =====
Genus Pseudochirops – Matschie, 1915 – five species
| Common name | Scientific name and subspecies | Range | Size and ecology | IUCN status and estimated population |
|---|---|---|---|---|
| Coppery ringtail possum | P. cupreus (Thomas, 1897) | Central New Guinea | Size: 28–41 cm (11–16 in) long, plus 25–38 cm (10–15 in) tail Habitat: Forest and grassland Diet: Leaves as well as fruit | LC Unknown |
| D'Albertis's ringtail possum | P. albertisii (Peters, 1874) Three subspecies: P. a. albertisii; P. a. insularis; P. a. schultzei | Western and northern New Guinea | Size: 28–41 cm (11–16 in) long, plus 25–38 cm (10–15 in) tail Habitat: Forest Diet: Leaves as well as fruit | NT Unknown |
| Green ringtail possum | P. archeri (Collett, 1884) | Northeastern Australia | Size: 28–41 cm (11–16 in) long, plus 25–38 cm (10–15 in) tail Habitat: Forest Diet: Leaves, as well as figs | NT 100,000 |
| Plush-coated ringtail possum | P. corinnae (Thomas, 1897) Three subspecies: P. c. argenteus; P. c. corinnae; P. c. fuscus | Central New Guinea | Size: 28–41 cm (11–16 in) long, plus 25–38 cm (10–15 in) tail Habitat: Forest Diet: Leaves as well as fruit | NT Unknown |
| Reclusive ringtail possum | P. coronatus (Thomas, 1897) | Western New Guinea | Size: 28–41 cm (11–16 in) long, plus 25–38 cm (10–15 in) tail Habitat: Forest Diet: Leaves as well as fruit | VU Unknown |

==== Tarsipedidae ====
Genus Tarsipes – Gervais & Verreaux, 1842 – one species
| Common name | Scientific name and subspecies | Range | Size and ecology | IUCN status and estimated population |
|---|---|---|---|---|
| Honey possum | T. rostratus Gervais & Verreaux, 1842 | Southwestern Australia | Size: 6–9 cm (2–4 in) long, plus 7–11 cm (3–4 in) tail Habitat: Shrubland Diet: Pollen and nectar | LC Unknown |

=== Superfamily Phalangeroidea ===
==== Burramyidae ====
Genus Burramys – Broom, 1895 – one species
| Common name | Scientific name and subspecies | Range | Size and ecology | IUCN status and estimated population |
|---|---|---|---|---|
| Mountain pygmy possum | B. parvus Broom, 1896 | Southeastern Australia | Size: 10–12 cm (4–5 in) long, plus 13–16 cm (5–6 in) tail Habitat: Shrubland Diet: Insects, spiders, seeds, and berries | CR Unknown |

Genus Cercartetus – Gloger, 1841 – four species
| Common name | Scientific name and subspecies | Range | Size and ecology | IUCN status and estimated population |
|---|---|---|---|---|
| Eastern pygmy possum | C. nanus (Desmarest, 1818) Two subspecies: C. n. nanus; C. n. unicolor | Southeastern Australia | Size: 7–10 cm (3–4 in) long, plus 7–11 cm (3–4 in) tail Habitat: Forest and shrubland Diet: Nectar, pollen, and insects | LC Unknown |
| Long-tailed pygmy possum | C. caudatus (H. Milne-Edwards, 1877) Two subspecies: C. c. caudatus; C. c. macrura | New Guinea and northeastern Australia | Size: 8–11 cm (3–4 in) long, plus 12–16 cm (5–6 in) tail Habitat: Forest and shrubland Diet: Nectar, insects, and pollen | LC Unknown |
| Tasmanian pygmy possum | C. lepidus Thomas, 1888 | Southern Australia | Size: 5–7 cm (2–3 in) long, plus 6–8 cm (2–3 in) tail Habitat: Forest and shrubland Diet: Nectar, pollen, invertebrates, and small lizards | LC Unknown |
| Western pygmy possum | C. concinnus (Gould, 1845) Two subspecies: C. c. concinnus; C. c. minor | Southern and southwestern Australia | Size: 6–11 cm (2–4 in) long, plus 5–11 cm (2–4 in) tail Habitat: Forest and shrubland Diet: Nectar, insects, and small lizards | LC Unknown |

==== Phalangeridae ====
===== Subfamily Ailuropinae =====
Genus Ailurops – Wagler, 1830 – two species
| Common name | Scientific name and subspecies | Range | Size and ecology | IUCN status and estimated population |
|---|---|---|---|---|
| Sulawesi bear cuscus | A. ursinus (Temminck, 1824) Four subspecies: A. u. flavissimus; A. u. furvus; A. u. togianus; A. u. ursinus | Sulawesi island in Indonesia | Size: 56–54 cm (22–21 in) long, plus 61–58 cm (24–23 in) tail Habitat: Forest Diet: Leaves, flowers, and fruit | VU Unknown |
| Talaud bear cuscus | A. melanotis (Thomas, 1898) | Salibabu Island in Indonesia | Size: 56–54 cm (22–21 in) long, plus 61–58 cm (24–23 in) tail Habitat: Forest Diet: Leaves as well as fruit | CR Unknown |

===== Subfamily Phalangerinae =====
Genus Phalanger – Storr, 1780 – thirteen species
| Common name | Scientific name and subspecies | Range | Size and ecology | IUCN status and estimated population |
|---|---|---|---|---|
| Blue-eyed cuscus | P. matabiru Flannery & Boeadi, 1995 | Ternate and Tidore islands in eastern Indonesia | Size: 32–60 cm (13–24 in) long, plus 24–61 cm (9–24 in) tail Habitat: Forest Diet: Fruit and leaves, as well as insects, small vertebrates, and eggs | VU Unknown |
| Eastern common cuscus | P. intercastellanus Thomas, 1895 | Eastern New Guinea | Size: 32–60 cm (13–24 in) long, plus 24–61 cm (9–24 in) tail Habitat: Forest Diet: Fruit and leaves, as well as insects, small vertebrates, and eggs | LC Unknown |
| Gebe cuscus | P. alexandrae Flannery & Boeadi, 1995 | Gebe island in eastern Indonesia | Size: 32–60 cm (13–24 in) long, plus 24–61 cm (9–24 in) tail Habitat: Forest Diet: Fruit and leaves, as well as insects, small vertebrates, and eggs | EN Unknown |
| Ground cuscus | P. gymnotis (Peters & Doria, 1875) Two subspecies: P. g. gymnotis; P. g. leucippus | New Guinea | Size: 32–60 cm (13–24 in) long, plus 24–61 cm (9–24 in) tail Habitat: Forest Diet: Fruit, eggs, seeds, and leaves | LC Unknown |
| Mountain cuscus | P. carmelitae Thomas, 1898 Two subspecies: P. c. carmelitae; P. c. coccygis | Central and eastern New Guinea | Size: 32–60 cm (13–24 in) long, plus 24–61 cm (9–24 in) tail Habitat: Forest Diet: Fruit and leaves, as well as insects, small vertebrates, and eggs | LC Unknown |
| Northern common cuscus | P. orientalis (Pallas, 1766) Two subspecies: P. o. breviceps; P. o. orientalis | New Guinea and nearby islands (introduced in red) | Size: 32–60 cm (13–24 in) long, plus 24–61 cm (9–24 in) tail Habitat: Forest Diet: Leaves, tree seeds, fruit, buds and flowers | LC Unknown |
| Ornate cuscus | P. ornatus (Gray, 1860) | North Maluku islands in eastern Indonesia | Size: 32–60 cm (13–24 in) long, plus 24–61 cm (9–24 in) tail Habitat: Forest Diet: Fruit and leaves, as well as insects, small vertebrates, and eggs | LC Unknown |
| Rothschild's cuscus | P. rothschildi Thomas, 1898 | Obi Islands in eastern Indonesia | Size: 32–60 cm (13–24 in) long, plus 24–61 cm (9–24 in) tail Habitat: Forest Diet: Fruit and leaves, as well as insects, small vertebrates, and eggs | LC Unknown |
| Silky cuscus | P. sericeus Thomas, 1907 Two subspecies: P. s. occidentalis; P. s. sericeus | Central and eastern New Guinea | Size: 32–60 cm (13–24 in) long, plus 24–61 cm (9–24 in) tail Habitat: Forest Diet: Fruit and leaves, as well as insects, small vertebrates, and eggs | LC Unknown |
| Southern common cuscus | P. mimicus Pallas, 1766 Two subspecies: P. m. mimicus; P. m. peninsulae | Southern New Guinea and northeastern Australia | Size: 32–60 cm (13–24 in) long, plus 24–61 cm (9–24 in) tail Habitat: Forest and savanna Diet: Fruit and leaves, as well as insects, small vertebrates, and eggs | LC Unknown |
| Stein's cuscus | P. vestitus (H. Milne-Edwards, 1877) | Scattered New Guinea | Size: 32–60 cm (13–24 in) long, plus 24–61 cm (9–24 in) tail Habitat: Forest Diet: Fruit and leaves, as well as insects, small vertebrates, and eggs | LC Unknown |
| Telefomin cuscus | P. matanim Flannery, 1987 | Central New Guinea | Size: 32–60 cm (13–24 in) long, plus 24–61 cm (9–24 in) tail Habitat: Forest Diet: Fruit and leaves, as well as insects, small vertebrates, and eggs | CR 40 |
| Woodlark cuscus | P. lullulae Thomas, 1896 | Madau and Woodlark Island east of New Guinea | Size: 32–60 cm (13–24 in) long, plus 24–61 cm (9–24 in) tail Habitat: Forest Diet: Vines | EN Unknown |

Genus Spilocuscus – Gray, 1861 – five species
| Common name | Scientific name and subspecies | Range | Size and ecology | IUCN status and estimated population |
|---|---|---|---|---|
| Admiralty Island cuscus | S. kraemeri (Schwarz, 1910) | Admiralty Islands north of New Guinea | Size: 33–64 cm (13–25 in) long, plus 31–59 cm (12–23 in) tail Habitat: Forest Diet: Leaves, coconuts, and other fruit | NT Unknown |
| Black-spotted cuscus | S. rufoniger (Zimara, 1937) | Northern New Guinea | Size: 33–64 cm (13–25 in) long, plus 31–59 cm (12–23 in) tail Habitat: Forest Diet: Believed to be omnivorous | CR Unknown |
| Blue-eyed spotted cuscus | S. wilsoni Helgen & Flannery, 2004 | Islands northwest of New Guinea | Size: 33–64 cm (13–25 in) long, plus 31–59 cm (12–23 in) tail Habitat: Forest Diet: Leaves, coconuts, and other fruit | CR Unknown |
| Common spotted cuscus | S. maculatus (Geoffroy, 1803) Four subspecies: S. m. chrysorrhous; S. m. goldiei; S. m. maculatus; S. m. nudicaudatus | New Guinea and northeastern Australia | Size: 48–56 cm (19–22 in) long, plus 31–33 cm (12–13 in) tail Habitat: Forest Diet: Leaves, fruit, insects, and small vertebrates | LC Unknown |
| Waigeou cuscus | S. papuensis (Desmarest, 1822) | Waigeo in eastern Indonesia | Size: 33–64 cm (13–25 in) long, plus 31–59 cm (12–23 in) tail Habitat: Forest Diet: Leaves, coconuts, and other fruit | VU Unknown |

Genus Strigocuscus – Gray, 1861 – two species
| Common name | Scientific name and subspecies | Range | Size and ecology | IUCN status and estimated population |
|---|---|---|---|---|
| Banggai cuscus | S. pelengensis (Tate, 1945) Two subspecies: S. p. mendeni; S. p. pelengensis | Peleng and Sula Islands in eastern Indonesia | Size: 35–37 cm (14–15 in) long, plus 24–30 cm (9–12 in) tail Habitat: Forest Diet: Fruit | LC Unknown |
| Sulawesi dwarf cuscus | S. celebensis (Gray, 1858) Three subspecies: S. c. celebensis; S. c. feileri; S. c. sangirensis | Sulawesi in Indonesia | Size: 29–38 cm (11–15 in) long, plus 27–38 cm (11–15 in) tail Habitat: Forest Diet: Fruit, flowers, and leaves | NT Unknown |

Genus Trichosurus – Lesson, 1828 – four species
| Common name | Scientific name and subspecies | Range | Size and ecology | IUCN status and estimated population |
|---|---|---|---|---|
| Common brushtail possum | T. vulpecula (Kerr, 1792) | Scattered Australia | Size: 32–58 cm (13–23 in) long, plus 24–35 cm (9–14 in) tail Habitat: Forest and savanna Diet: Leaves, shoots, and flowers | LC Unknown |
| Coppery brushtail possum | T. johnstonii (Ramsay, 1888) | Northeastern Australia | Size: 40–49 cm (16–19 in) long, plus 30–40 cm (12–16 in) tail Habitat: Forest Diet: Leaves and fruit | NE Unknown |
| Mountain brushtail possum | T. cunninghami Lindenmayer, Dubach & Viggers, 2002 | Southeastern Australia | Size: 32–58 cm (13–23 in) long, plus 24–40 cm (9–16 in) tail Habitat: Forest Diet: Leaves, fungi, lichen, buds, and fruit, as well as bark | LC Unknown |
| Short-eared possum | T. caninus (Ogilby, 1836) | Eastern Australia | Size: 32–58 cm (13–23 in) long, plus 24–40 cm (9–16 in) tail Habitat: Forest Diet: Leaves, fruit, buds, fungi, bark, and insects | LC Unknown |

Genus Wyulda – Alexander, 1918 – one species
| Common name | Scientific name and subspecies | Range | Size and ecology | IUCN status and estimated population |
|---|---|---|---|---|
| Scaly-tailed possum | W. squamicaudata Alexander, 1918 | Northwestern Australia | Size: 29–47 cm (11–19 in) long, plus 25–33 cm (10–13 in) tail Habitat: Forest, savanna, and rocky areas Diet: Leaves | NT 5,000–10,000 |

== Sources ==
- Groves, Colin P. (2005). Wilson, Don E.; Reeder, DeeAnn M. (eds.). Mammal Species of the World. Vol. 1 (3rd ed.). Johns Hopkins University Press. ISBN 978-0-8018-8221-0.
- Nowak, Ronald M. (2018). Walker's Mammals of the World. Vol. Monotremes, Marsupials, Afrotherians, Xenarthrans, and Sundatherians. Johns Hopkins University Press. ISBN 978-1-4214-2468-2.
