= List of diprotodonts =

Animals in mammal order Diprotodontia

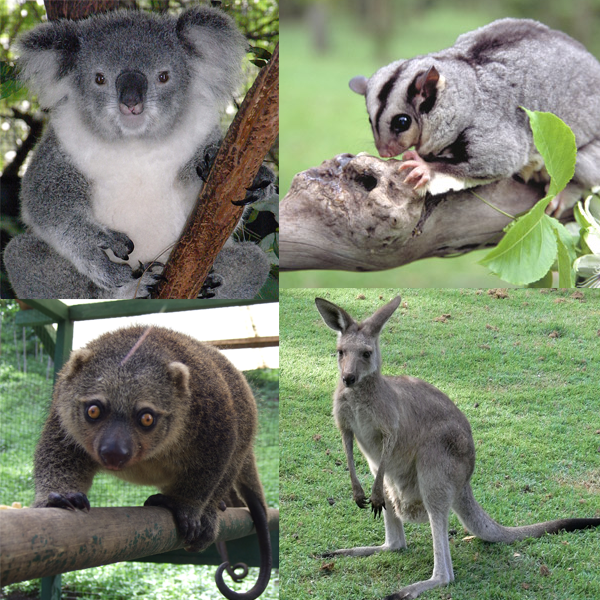
Clockwise from upper left: koala (Phascolarctos cinereus), mahogany glider (Petaurus gracilis), eastern grey kangaroo (Macropus giganteus) and Sulawesi bear cuscus (Ailurops ursinus)

Diprotodontia is an order of Australian marsupial mammals. Members of this order are called diprotodonts. Diprotodontia is the largest order of marsupials and currently comprises 139 extant species, which are grouped into 39 genera. They are found in Australia, New Guinea, and Indonesia, in forests, shrublands, grasslands, and savannas, though some species are found in deserts and rocky areas. They come in a wide array of sizes, ranging from the Tasmanian pygmy possum, at 5 cm (2 in) plus a 6 cm (2 in) tail, to the red kangaroo, at 160 cm (63 in) plus a 120 cm (47 in) tail.

Diprotodontia is subdivided into three suborders: Macropodiformes, Phalangeriformes, and Vombatiformes. Macropodiformes has 71 species in 3 families: Hypsiprymnodontidae, Macropodidae, and Potoroidae, and includes kangaroos, wallabies, bettongs, potoroos, and rat-kangaroos. Phalangeriformes has 64 species in 6 families: Acrobatidae, Petauridae, Pseudocheiridae, Tarsipedidae, Burramyidae, and Phalangeridae, and includes cuscus and the brushtail, ringtail, and gliding possums. Vombatiformes has only four species in two families: Phascolarctidae, the koala, and Vombatidae, the wombats. The classification of species in the order is not fixed, with many recent proposals for changes made based on molecular phylogenetic analysis. Additionally, the present set of suborders was created beginning in 1997 by splitting the former suborder Phalangerida into Macropodiformes and Phalangeriformes, and further reorganizations have been proposed.

In addition to the extant species, nine species in the suborder Macropodiformes—four in the family Macropodidae and four in Potoroidae—have been made extinct in the modern era, eight between the 1880s and the 1940s after the colonization of Australia began: the broad-faced potoroo, crescent nail-tail wallaby, desert bettong, desert rat-kangaroo, eastern hare-wallaby, Lake Mackay hare-wallaby, Nullarbor dwarf bettong, and toolache wallaby, and one in 2026, the woylie. Dozens of extinct, prehistoric Diprotodont species have also been discovered, though due to ongoing research and discoveries the exact number and categorization is not fixed.

== Conventions ==
The author citation for the species or genus is given after the scientific name; parentheses around the author citation indicate that this was not the original taxonomic placement. Range maps are provided wherever possible; if a range map is not available, a description of the collective range of species in that genera is provided. Ranges are based on the International Union for Conservation of Nature (IUCN) Red List of Threatened Species unless otherwise noted. All extinct genera or species listed alongside extant species went extinct after 1500 CE, and are indicated by a dagger symbol "†".

== Classification ==
- Diprotodontia
  - - Macropodiformes
      - - Macropodidae
        - Potoroidae
      - Hypsiprymnodontidae
    - Phalangeriformes
      - Petauroidea
        - Acrobatidae
        - - Tarsipedidae
          - - Petauridae
            - Pseudocheiridae
      - Phalangeroidea
        - Burramyidae
        - Phalangeridae
  - - Vombatiformes
      - Phascolarctidae
      - Vombatidae

The order Diprotodontia consists of 140 extant species belonging to 39 genera. This does not include hybrid species or extinct prehistoric species. Modern molecular studies indicate that the 39 genera can be grouped into 11 families; these families are grouped into the suborders Macropodiformes, Phalangeriformes, and Vombatiformes, and many are further grouped into named clades or subfamilies. In addition to the extant species, eight species in the suborder Phalangeriformes—four in the family Macropodidae and four in Potoroidae, including one extinct genus—have been made extinct in the modern era, all between the 1880s and the 1940s after the colonization of Australia began.

Suborder Macropodiformes

- Family Hypsiprymnodontidae (musky rat-kangaroo): 1 genus, 1 species
- Family Macropodidae
  - Subfamily Macropodinae (kangaroos and wallabies) 12 genera, 66 species (4 extinct)
  - Subfamily Sthenurinae (banded hare-wallaby) 1 genera, 1 species
- Family Potoroidae (bettongs, potoroos, and rat-kangaroos) 4 genera (1 extinct), 9 species (3 extinct)

Suborder Phalangeriformes

- Superfamily Petauroidea
  - Family Acrobatidae (feather-tailed possum and feather-tailed glider): 2 genera, 2 species
  - Family Petauridae (possums): 3 genera, 11 species
  - Family Pseudocheiridae
    - Subfamily Hemibelideinae (greater gliders): 2 genera, 2 species
    - Subfamily Pseudocheirinae (ringtail possums): 3 genera, 11 species
    - Subfamily Pseudochiropsinae (false ringtail possums): 1 genus, 5 species
  - Family Tarsipedidae (honey possum): 1 genus, 1 species
- Superfamily Phalangeroidea
  - Family Burramyidae (pygmy possums): 2 genera, 5 species
  - Family Phalangeridae
    - Subfamily Ailuropinae (bear cuscus): 1 genus, 2 species
    - Subfamily Phalangerinae (cuscus): 5 genera, 25 species

Suborder Vombatiformes

- Family Phascolarctidae (koala): 1 genus, 1 species
- Family Vombatidae (wombats): 2 genera, 3 species

== Diprotodonts ==
The following classification is based on the taxonomy described by Mammal Species of the World (2005), with augmentation by generally accepted proposals made since using molecular phylogenetic analysis, as supported by both the IUCN and the American Society of Mammalogists.

=== Suborder Macropodiformes ===
==== Hypsiprymnodontidae ====
Not assigned to a named subfamily – one genus
Name	Authority and species	Range	Size and ecology
Hypsiprymnodon (musky rat-kangaroo)	Ramsay, 1876 One species: H. moschatus (Musky rat-kangaroo)	Northeastern Australia	Size: 20–35 cm (8–14 in) long, plus 6–13 cm (2–5 in) tail Habitat: Forest Diet: Insects, as well as worms, tuberous roots, and palm berries

==== Macropodidae ====
Subfamily Macropodinae – Gray, 1821 – twelve genera
Name	Authority and species	Range	Size and ecology
Dendrolagus (tree-kangaroo)	Müller, 1840 Fourteen species: D. bennettianus (Bennett's tree-kangaroo); D. dorianus (Doria's tree-kangaroo); D. goodfellowi (Goodfellow's tree-kangaroo); D. inustus (Grizzled tree-kangaroo); D. lumholtzi (Lumholtz's tree-kangaroo); D. matschiei (Matschie's tree-kangaroo, pictured); D. mayri (Wondiwoi tree-kangaroo); D. mbaiso (Dingiso); D. notatus (Ifola); D. pulcherrimus (Golden-mantled tree-kangaroo); D. scottae (Tenkile); D. spadix (Lowlands tree-kangaroo); D. stellarum (Seri's tree-kangaroo); D. ursinus (Ursine tree-kangaroo)	New Guinea and northeastern Australia	Size range: 41 cm (16 in) long, plus 40 cm (16 in) tail (Doria's tree-kangaroo) to 81 cm (32 in) long plus 94 cm (37 in) tail (dingiso) Habitats: Forest and shrubland Diets: Leaves, flowers, and fruit, as well as ferns, soft vines, cereals, grass, bark, nuts, insects, sap, bird eggs, and young birds
Dorcopsis (dorcopsis)	Schlegel & Müller, 1842 Four species: D. atrata (Black dorcopsis); D. hageni (White-striped dorcopsis, pictured); D. luctuosa (Gray dorcopsis); D. muelleri (Brown dorcopsis)	New Guinea	Size range: 34 cm (13 in) long, plus 27 cm (11 in) tail (brown dorcopsis) to 100 cm (39 in) long plus 40 cm (16 in) tail (black dorcopsis) Habitat: Forest Diets: Leaves, roots, grass and fruit
Dorcopsulus (forest wallaby)	Matschie, 1916 Two species: D. macleayi (Macleay's dorcopsis, pictured); D. vanheurni (Small dorcopsis)	New Guinea	Size range: 31–46 cm (12–18 in) long, plus 22–41 cm (9–16 in) tail Habitat: Forest Diets: Leaves, fruit, buds, and stems
Lagorchestes (hare-wallaby)	Gould, 1841 Four species: L. asomatus (Lake Mackay hare-wallaby) †; L. conspicillatus (Spectacled hare-wallaby); L. hirsutus (Rufous hare-wallaby); L. leporides (Eastern hare-wallaby) †	Australia	Size range: 31 cm (12 in) long, plus 24 cm (9 in) tail (rufous hare-wallaby) to 49 cm (19 in) long plus 53 cm (21 in) tail (spectacled hare-wallaby) Habitats: Desert, grassland, forest, shrubland, and savanna Diets: Grass, forbs, herbs, seeds, fruit, sedges, and succulent shrubs
Macropus (grey kangaroo)	Shaw, 1790 Two species: M. fuliginosus (Western grey kangaroo); M. giganteus (Eastern grey kangaroo, pictured)	Southern and eastern Australia	Size range: 85–140 cm (33–55 in) long, plus 75–100 cm (30–39 in) tail Habitats: Savanna, grassland, shrubland, and forest Diets: Grass, forbs, leaves, tree bark, and shrubs
Notamacropus (brush wallaby)	Dawson & Flannery, 1985 Eight species: N. agilis (Agile wallaby); N. dorsalis (Black-striped wallaby); N. eugenii (Tammar wallaby); N. greyi (Toolache wallaby) †; N. irma (Western brush wallaby); N. parma (Parma wallaby); N. parryi (Whiptail wallaby, pictured); N. rufogriseus (Red-necked wallaby)	Australia and southern New Guinea	Size range: 40 cm (16 in) long, plus 33 cm (13 in) tail (several) to 105 cm (41 in) long plus 75 cm (30 in) tail (red-necked wallaby) Habitats: Shrubland, grassland, savanna, and forest Diets: Grass, ferns, herbs, shrubs, bushes, and roots, as well as leaves and fruit
Osphranter	Shaw, 1790 Four species: O. antilopinus (Antilopine kangaroo); O. bernardus (Black wallaroo); O. robustus (Common wallaroo); O. rufus (Red kangaroo, pictured)	Australia	Size range: 73 cm (29 in) long, plus 64 cm (25 in) tail (black wallaroo) to 160 cm (63 in) long plus 120 cm (47 in) tail (red kangaroo) Habitats: Desert, grassland, forest, shrubland, and savanna Diets: Grass and shrubs
Onychogalea (nail-tail wallaby)	Gray, 1841 Three species: O. fraenata (Bridled nail-tail wallaby, pictured); O. lunata (Crescent nail-tail wallaby) †; O. unguifera (Northern nail-tail wallaby)	Scattered Australia	Size range: 37 cm (15 in) long, plus 15 cm (6 in) tail (crescent nail-tail wallaby) to 70 cm (28 in) long plus 73 cm (29 in) tail (bridled nail-tail wallaby) Habitats: Savanna, grassland, shrubland, and forest Diets: Herbs, succulents, fruit, grass, forbs, and shrubs
Petrogale (rock-wallaby)	Gray, 1837 Sixteen species: P. assimilis (Allied rock-wallaby); P. brachyotis (Short-eared rock-wallaby); P. burbidgei (Monjon); P. coenensis (Cape York rock-wallaby); P. concinna (Nabarlek); P. godmani (Godman's rock-wallaby); P. herberti (Herbert's rock-wallaby); P. inornata (Unadorned rock-wallaby); P. lateralis (Black-flanked rock-wallaby); P. mareeba (Mareeba rock-wallaby); P. penicillata (Brush-tailed rock-wallaby); P. persephone (Proserpine rock-wallaby); P. purpureicollis (Purple-necked rock-wallaby); P. rothschildi (Rothschild's rock-wallaby); P. sharmani (Mount Claro rock-wallaby); P. xanthopus (Yellow-footed rock-wallaby, pictured)	Australia	Size range: 29 cm (11 in) long, plus 25 cm (10 in) tail (monjon) to 70 cm (28 in) long plus 70 cm (28 in) tail (allied rock-wallaby) Habitats: Desert, grassland, forest, shrubland, rocky areas, and savanna Diets: Grass and leaves, as well as shrubs, forbs, fungi, sedges, ferns, roots, bark, fruit, seeds and flowers
Setonix (quokka)	Lesson, 1842 One species: S. brachyurus (Quokka)	Southwestern Australia	Size: 39–60 cm (15–24 in) long, plus 23–35 cm (9–14 in) tail Habitats: Forest, shrubland, and inland wetlands Diet: Succulents, shrubs, forbs, grasses and sedges, as well as seeds, berries, and fruit
Thylogale (pademelon)	Gray, 1837 Seven species: T. billardierii (Tasmanian pademelon, pictured); T. browni (Brown's pademelon); T. brunii (Dusky pademelon); T. calabyi (Calaby's pademelon); T. lanatus (Mountain pademelon); T. stigmatica (Red-legged pademelon); T. thetis (Red-necked pademelon)	New Guinea, eastern Australia, and Tasmania	Size range: 29–67 cm (11–26 in) long, plus 24–57 cm (9–22 in) tail (several) Habitats: Savanna, grassland, shrubland, and forest Diets: Grass, leaves, shoots, seeds, and fruit, as well as grass, bark, fungi, and cicadas
Wallabia (swamp wallaby)	Trouessart, 1905 One species: W. bicolor (Swamp wallaby)	Eastern Australia	Size: 66–85 cm (26–33 in) long, plus 64–87 cm (25–34 in) tail Habitats: Forest and shrubland Diet: Buds, ferns, leaves, shrubs, and grasses, as well as bark and shoots from needle-leaf trees

Subfamily Sthenurinae – Glauert, 1826 – one genus
Name	Authority and species	Range	Size and ecology
Lagostrophus (banded hare-wallaby)	Thomas, 1887 One species: L. fasciatus (Banded hare-wallaby)	Western Australia	Size: 40–46 cm (16–18 in) long, plus 32–40 cm (13–16 in) tail Habitat: Shrubland Diet: Plants and fruit

==== Potoroidae ====
Not assigned to a named subfamily – four genera
Name	Authority and species	Range	Size and ecology
Aepyprymnus (rufous rat-kangaroo)	Garrod, 1875 One species: A. rufescens (Rufous rat-kangaroo)	Northeastern Australia	Size: 37–52 cm (15–20 in) long, plus 35–40 cm (14–16 in) tail Habitats: Forest and savanna Diet: Grass, herbs, roots, tubers, and fungi, as well as carrion bones and larvae
Bettongia (bettong)	Gray, 1837 Six species: B. anhydra (Desert bettong) †; B. gaimardi (Eastern bettong, pictured); B. lesueur (Boodie); B. penicillata (Woylie) †; B. pusilla (Nullarbor dwarf bettong) †; B. tropica (Northern bettong)	Australia	Size range: 27–44 cm (11–17 in) long, plus 26–35 cm (10–14 in) tail (northern bettong) Habitats: Desert, forest, shrubland, and savanna Diets: Leaves, seeds, fruits, nuts, tubers, bulbs, flowers, and fungi, as well as insects, resin, marine carrion, and small invertebrates
Caloprymnus † (desert rat-kangaroo)	Thomas, 1888 One species: C. campestris (Desert rat-kangaroo) †	Central Australia	Size: 25–29 cm (10–11 in) long, plus 29–38 cm (11–15 in) tail Habitat: Desert Diet: Leaves and stems, as well as insects
Potorous (potoroo)	Desmarest, 1804 Four species: P. gilbertii (Gilbert's potoroo); P. longipes (Long-footed potoroo); P. platyops (Broad-faced potoroo) †; P. tridactylus (Long-nosed potoroo, pictured)	Southwestern Australia, southeastern Australia, and Tasmania	Size range: 24–42 cm (9–17 in) long, plus 19–33 cm (7–13 in) tail (several) Habitats: Shrubland, inland wetlands, and forest Diets: Fungi, insects, grass, roots, and other vegetation

=== Suborder Phalangeriformes ===
==== Superfamily Petauroidea ====
===== Acrobatidae =====
Not assigned to a named subfamily – two genera
Name	Authority and species	Range	Size and ecology
Acrobates (feathertail glider)	Desmarest, 1818 One species: A. pygmaeus (Feathertail glider)	Eastern Australia	Size: 6–8 cm (2–3 in) long, plus 7–8 cm (3 in) tail Habitat: Forest Diet: Honeydew and arthropods
Distoechurus (feather-tailed possum)	Peters, 1874 One species: D. pennatus (Feather-tailed possum)	New Guinea	Size: 10–12 cm (4–5 in) long, plus 6–12 cm (2–5 in) tail Habitat: Forest Diet: Nectar, pollen, insects, and soft fruit

===== Petauridae =====
Not assigned to a named subfamily – three genera
Name	Authority and species	Range	Size and ecology
Dactylopsila (triok)	Gray, 1858 Four species: D. megalura (Great-tailed triok); D. palpator (Long-fingered triok); D. tatei (Tate's triok); D. trivirgata (Striped possum, pictured)	New Guinea and northeastern Australia (in orange)	Size range: 17–32 cm (7–13 in) long, plus 16–40 cm (6–16 in) tail (several) Habitat: Forest Diets: Insects, fruit, and leaves
Gymnobelideus (Leadbeater's possum)	McCoy, 1867 One species: G. leadbeateri (Leadbeater's possum)	Southern Australia	Size: 15–17 cm (6–7 in) long, plus 14–18 cm (6–7 in) tail Habitat: Forest Diet: Insects, spiders, and sap
Petaurus (wrist-winged glider)	Shaw, 1791 Six species: P. abidi (Northern glider); P. australis (Yellow-bellied glider); P. biacensis (Biak glider); P. breviceps (Sugar glider); P. gracilis (Mahogany glider, pictured); P. norfolcensis (Squirrel glider)	New Guinea and northern, eastern, and southern Australia (in blue)	Size range: 12–32 cm (5–13 in) long, plus 15–48 cm (6–19 in) tail (various) Habitats: Savanna and forest Diets: Nectar, pollen, sap, gum, seeds, insects, arachnids, and small vertebrates

===== Pseudocheiridae =====
Subfamily Hemibelideinae – Kirsch, Lapointe & Springer, 1997 – two genera
Name	Authority and species	Range	Size and ecology
Hemibelideus (lemuroid ringtail possum)	Collett, 1884 One species: H. lemuroides (Lemuroid ringtail possum)	Northeastern Australia	Size: 30–38 cm (12–15 in) long, plus 30–35 cm (12–14 in) tail Habitat: Forest Diet: Leaves
Petauroides (southern greater glider)	Thomas, 1888 One species: P. volans (Southern greater glider)	Southeastern Australia	Size: 30–48 cm (12–19 in) long, plus 45–55 cm (18–22 in) tail Habitat: Forest Diet: Eucalyptus leaves

Subfamily Pseudocheirinae – Winge, 1893 – three genera
Name	Authority and species	Range	Size and ecology
Petropseudes (rock-haunting ringtail possum)	Thomas, 1923 One species: P. dahli (Rock-haunting ringtail possum)	Northern Australia	Size: 33–38 cm (13–15 in) long, plus 20–27 cm (8–11 in) tail Habitats: Rocky areas Diet: Leaves, fruit, blossoms, and flowers, as well as termites
Pseudocheirus (ringtail possum)	Ogilby, 1837 Two species: P. occidentalis (Western ringtail possum); P. peregrinus (Common ringtail possum, pictured)	Eastern, southern, and southwestern Australia	Size range: 28–40 cm (11–16 in) long, plus 28–36 cm (11–14 in) tail (Western ringtail possum) Habitats: Savanna and forest Diets: Leaves, as well as flowers, buds, nectar, fruit, bark, and sap
Pseudochirulus (slender ringtail possum)	Matschie, 1915 Eight species: P. canescens (Lowland ringtail possum); P. caroli (Weyland ringtail possum); P. cinereus (Daintree River ringtail possum, pictured); P. forbesi (Painted ringtail possum); P. herbertensis (Herbert River ringtail possum); P. larvatus (Masked ringtail possum); P. mayeri (Pygmy ringtail possum); P. schlegeli (Vogelkop ringtail possum)	New Guinea and northeastern Australia	Size range: 16 cm (6 in) long, plus 15 cm (6 in) tail (several) to 40 cm (16 in) long plus 47 cm (19 in) tail (Herbert River ringtail possum) Habitat: Forest Diets: Leaves, fruit, ferns, pollen, fungus, moss, and lichens

Subfamily Pseudochiropsinae – Kirsch, Lapointe & Springer, 1997 – one genus
Name	Authority and species	Range	Size and ecology
Pseudochirops (ringtail possum)	Matschie, 1915 Five species: P. albertisii (D'Albertis's ringtail possum); P. archeri (Green ringtail possum, pictured); P. corinnae (Plush-coated ringtail possum); P. coronatus (Reclusive ringtail possum); P. cupreus (Coppery ringtail possum)	New Guinea and northeastern Australia	Size range: 28–41 cm (11–16 in) long, plus 25–38 cm (10–15 in) tail (several) Habitats: Grassland and forest Diets: Leaves as well as fruit

===== Tarsipedidae =====
Not assigned to a named subfamily – one genus
Name	Authority and species	Range	Size and ecology
Tarsipes (honey possum)	Gervais & Verreaux, 1842 One species: T. rostratus (Honey possum)	Southwestern Australia	Size: 6–9 cm (2–4 in) long, plus 7–11 cm (3–4 in) tail Habitat: Shrubland Diet: Pollen and nectar

==== Superfamily Phalangeroidea ====
===== Burramyidae =====
Not assigned to a named subfamily – two genera
Name	Authority and species	Range	Size and ecology
Burramys (mountain pygmy possum)	Broom, 1895 One species: B. parvus (Mountain pygmy possum)	Southeastern Australia	Size: 10–12 cm (4–5 in) long, plus 13–16 cm (5–6 in) tail Habitat: Shrubland Diet: Insects, spiders, seeds, and berries
Cercartetus (pygmy possum)	Gloger, 1841 Four species: C. caudatus (Long-tailed pygmy possum); C. concinnus (Western pygmy possum, pictured); C. lepidus (Tasmanian pygmy possum); C. nanus (Eastern pygmy possum)	New Guinea and northeastern and southern Australia (in red)	Size range: 5 cm (2 in) long, plus 6 cm (2 in) tail (Tasmanian pygmy possum) to 11 cm (4 in) long plus 16 cm (6 in) tail (long-tailed pygmy possum) Habitats: Shrubland and forest Diets: Nectar, pollen, invertebrates, and small lizards

===== Phalangeridae =====
Subfamily Ailuropinae – Flannery, Archer & Maynes, 1987 – one genus
Name	Authority and species	Range	Size and ecology
Ailurops (bear cuscus)	Wagler, 1830 Two species: A. melanotis (Talaud bear cuscus); A. ursinus (Sulawesi bear cuscus, pictured)	Sulawesi island and Salibabu Island in Indonesia	Size range: 56–54 cm (22–21 in) long, plus 61–58 cm (24–23 in) tail (both species) Habitat: Forest Diets: Leaves, flowers, and fruit

Subfamily Phalangerinae – Thomas, 1888 – five genera
Name	Authority and species	Range	Size and ecology
Phalanger	Storr, 1780 Thirteen species: P. alexandrae (Gebe cuscus); P. carmelitae (Mountain cuscus); P. gymnotis (Ground cuscus); P. intercastellanus (Eastern common cuscus); P. lullulae (Woodlark cuscus); P. matabiru (Blue-eyed cuscus); P. matanim (Telefomin cuscus); P. mimicus (Southern common cuscus, pictured); P. orientalis (Northern common cuscus); P. ornatus (Ornate cuscus); P. rothschildi (Rothschild's cuscus); P. sericeus (Silky cuscus); P. vestitus (Stein's cuscus)	New Guinea and nearby islands	Size range: 32–60 cm (13–24 in) long, plus 24–61 cm (9–24 in) tail (all species) Habitats: Savanna and forest Diets: Leaves, seeds, fruit, buds, vines, flowers, insects, small vertebrates, and eggs
Spilocuscus	Gray, 1861 Five species: S. kraemeri (Admiralty Island cuscus); S. maculatus (Common spotted cuscus, pictured); S. papuensis (Waigeou cuscus); S. rufoniger (Black-spotted cuscus); S. wilsoni (Blue-eyed spotted cuscus)	New Guinea, nearby islands, and northeastern Australia	Size range: 33–64 cm (13–25 in) long, plus 31–59 cm (12–23 in) tail (several) Habitat: Forest Diets: Leaves, coconuts, fruit, insects, and small vertebrates
Strigocuscus (dwarf cuscus)	Gray, 1861 Two species: S. celebensis (Sulawesi dwarf cuscus, pictured); S. pelengensis (Banggai cuscus)	Sulawesi and nearby islands in Indonesia	Size range: 29–38 cm (11–15 in) long, plus 27–38 cm (11–15 in) tail (Sulawesi dwarf cuscus) Habitat: Forest Diets: Fruit, flowers, and leaves
Trichosurus (brushtail possum)	Lesson, 1828 Four species: T. caninus (Short-eared possum); T. cunninghami (Mountain brushtail possum); T. johnstonii (Coppery brushtail possum); T. vulpecula (Common brushtail possum, pictured)	Scattered Australia	Size range: 32–58 cm (13–23 in) long, plus 24–35 cm (9–14 in) tail (several) Habitats: Savanna and forest Diets: Leaves, shoots, fruit, flowers, fungi, lichen, buds, and insects, as well as bark
Wyulda (scaly-tailed possum)	Alexander, 1918 One species: W. squamicaudata (Scaly-tailed possum)	Northwestern Australia	Size: 29–47 cm (11–19 in) long, plus 25–33 cm (10–13 in) tail Habitats: Forest, savanna, and rocky areas Diet: Leaves

=== Suborder Vombatiformes ===
==== Phascolarctidae ====
Not assigned to a named subfamily – one genus
Name	Authority and species	Range	Size and ecology
Phascolarctos (koala)	Blainville, 1816 One species: P. cinereus (Koala)	Eastern Australia	Size: 68–82 cm (27–32 in) long Habitats: Forest and shrubland Diet: Eucalyptus leaves, as well as other leaves

==== Vombatidae ====
Not assigned to a named subfamily – two genera
Name	Authority and species	Range	Size and ecology
Lasiorhinus (hairy-nosed wombat)	Gray, 1863 Two species: L. krefftii (Northern hairy-nosed wombat); L. latifrons (Southern hairy-nosed wombat)	Southern and eastern Australia	Size range: 77 cm (30 in) long (southern hairy-nosed wombat) to 111 cm (44 in) long (northern hairy-nosed wombat) Habitats: Forest, savanna, and grassland Diets: Grass and herbs
Vombatus (common wombat)	Saint-Hilaire, 1803 One species: V. ursinus (Common wombat)	Southern and southeastern Australia	Size: 70–110 cm (28–43 in) long Habitats: Forest and shrubland Diet: Leaves, grass, sedges, and moss, as well as shrubs, roots, tubers, and bark

== Sources ==
- Groves, Colin P. (2005). Wilson, Don E.; Reeder, DeeAnn M. (eds.). Mammal Species of the World. Vol. 1 (3rd ed.). Johns Hopkins University Press. ISBN 978-0-8018-8221-0.
- Menkhorst, Peter; Knight, Frank (2011). A Field Guide to the Mammals of Australia (3rd ed.). Oxford University Press. ISBN 978-0-19-557395-4.
- Nowak, Ronald M. (2018). Walker's Mammals of the World. Vol. Monotremes, Marsupials, Afrotherians, Xenarthrans, and Sundatherians. Johns Hopkins University Press. ISBN 978-1-4214-2468-2.
- Nowak, Ronald M. (2005). Walker's Marsupials of the World. Johns Hopkins University Press. ISBN 978-0-8018-8222-7.
- Pattiselanno, Freddy; Koibur, Juohan F.; Arobaya, Agustina Y. S. (2020). Dabek, Lisa; Valentine, Peter; Blessington, Jacque; Schwartz, Karin R. (eds.). Tree Kangaroos: Science and Conservation. Elsevier. ISBN 978-0-12-814675-0.
- Richardson, Ken (2012). Australia's Amazing Kangaroos: Their Conservation, Unique Biology and Coexistence with Humans. CSIRO Publishing. ISBN 978-0-643-09739-1.
- Strahan, Ronald (1995). Mammals of Australia. Smithsonian Institution. ISBN 978-1-56098-673-7.
- Taylor, Barbara (2022). The Magnificent Book of Extinct Animals. Weldon Owen. ISBN 978-1-68188-737-1.
