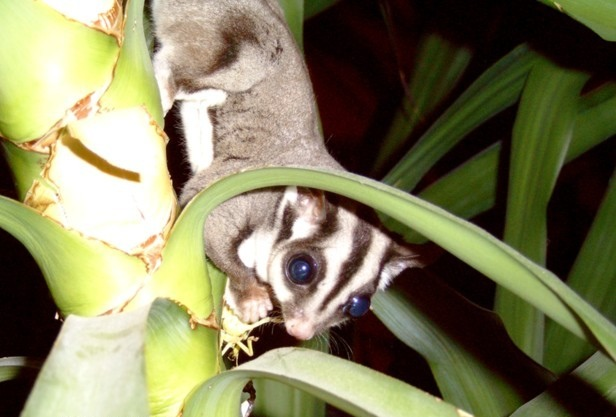
- Petaurus breviceps

Scientific classification
- Kingdom: Animalia
- Phylum: Chordata
- Class: Mammalia
- Infraclass: Marsupialia
- Order: Diprotodontia
- Suborder: Phalangeriformes
- Superfamily: Petauroidea; C.L. Bonaparte, 1838

Families
- Pseudocheiridae; Petauridae; Tarsipedidae; Acrobatidae

= Petauroidea =

Petauroidea Temporal range: Oligocene - recent

Superfamily of marsupials

Petauroidea is a superfamily of marsupials from Australia and New Guinea. It is part of the suborder Phalangeriformes within the order Diprotodontia, which also includes, among others, wombats, kangaroos, cuscuses. The superfamily Phalangeroidea, including cuscuses and brushtail possums (family Phalangeridae) and pygmy possums (family Burramyidae), is the immediate sister group of the Petauroidea. The earliest fossils from this superfamily are from the Oligocene of the Geilston Bay fossil site in Tasmania.

== Species ==
The superfamily includes the following recent species:

- Superfamily Petauroidea
  - Family Pseudocheiridae
    - Subfamily Hemibelideinae
      - Genus Hemibelideus
        - Lemur-like ringtail possum, Hemibelideus lemuroides
      - Genus Petauroides
        - Central greater glider, Petauroides armillatus
        - Northern greater glider, Petauroides minor
        - Southern greater glider, Petauroides volans
    - Subfamily Pseudocheirinae
      - Genus Petropseudes
        - Rock-haunting ringtail possum, Petropseudes dahli
      - Genus Pseudocheirus
        - Common ringtail possum, Pseudocheirus peregrinus
      - Genus Pseudochirulus
        - Lowland ringtail possum, Pseudochirulus canescens
        - Weyland ringtail possum, Pseudochirulus caroli
        - Cinereus ringtail possum, Pseudochirulus cinereus
        - Painted ringtail possum, Pseudochirulus forbesi
        - Herbert River ringtail possum, Pseudochirulus herbertensis
        - Masked ringtail possum, Pseudochirulus larvatus
        - Pygmy ringtail possum, Pseudochirulus mayeri
        - Vogelkop ringtail possum, Pseudochirulus schlegeli
    - Subfamily Pseudochiropsinae
      - Genus Pseudochirops
        - D'Albertis' ringtail possum, Pseudochirops albertisii
        - Green ringtail possum, Pseudochirops archeri
        - Plush-coated ringtail possum, Pseudochirops corinnae
        - Reclusive ringtail possum, Pseudochirops coronatus
        - Coppery ringtail possum, Pseudochirops cupreus
  - Family Petauridae
    - Genus Dactylopsila
      - Great-tailed triok, Dactylopsila megalura
      - Long-fingered triok, Dactylopsila palpator
      - Tate's triok, Dactylopsila tatei
      - Striped possum, Dactylopsila trivirgata
    - Genus Gymnobelideus
      - Leadbeater's possum, Gymnobelideus leadbeateri
    - Genus Petaurus
      - Northern glider, Petaurus abidi
      - Savanna glider, Petaurus ariel
      - Yellow-bellied glider, Petaurus australis
      - Biak glider, Petaurus biacensis
      - Sugar glider, Petaurus breviceps
      - Mahogany glider, Petaurus gracilis
      - Squirrel glider, Petaurus norfolcensis
      - Krefft's glider, Petaurus notatus
  - Family Tarsipedidae
    - Genus Tarsipes
      - Honey possum or Noolbenger, Tarsipes rostratus
  - Family Acrobatidae
    - Genus Acrobates
      - Feathertail glider, Acrobates pygmaeus
    - Genus Distoechurus
      - Feather-tailed possum, Distoechurus pennatus
