= Pildra =

Pildra Temporal range: Late Oligocene - Early Miocene

Scientific classification
- Kingdom: Animalia
- Phylum: Chordata
- Class: Mammalia
- Infraclass: Marsupialia
- Order: Diprotodontia
- Family: Pseudocheiridae
- Genus: †Pildra; Woodburne, Tedford & Archer 1987

Species
- Pildra antiquus Pildra magnus Pildra secundus Pildra tertius

Extinct genus of marsupials

Pildra is an extinct genus of Pseudocheiridae from the Oligocene–Miocene of Australia. Specimens have been collected from the Tirari Desert and Frome Basin in northern South Australia and the Oligo-Miocene freshwater limestone deposits of the Riversleigh World Heritage Area in northwestern Queensland.

It is estimated to have weighed between 100 and 300 g (3.5 and 10.6 oz).
