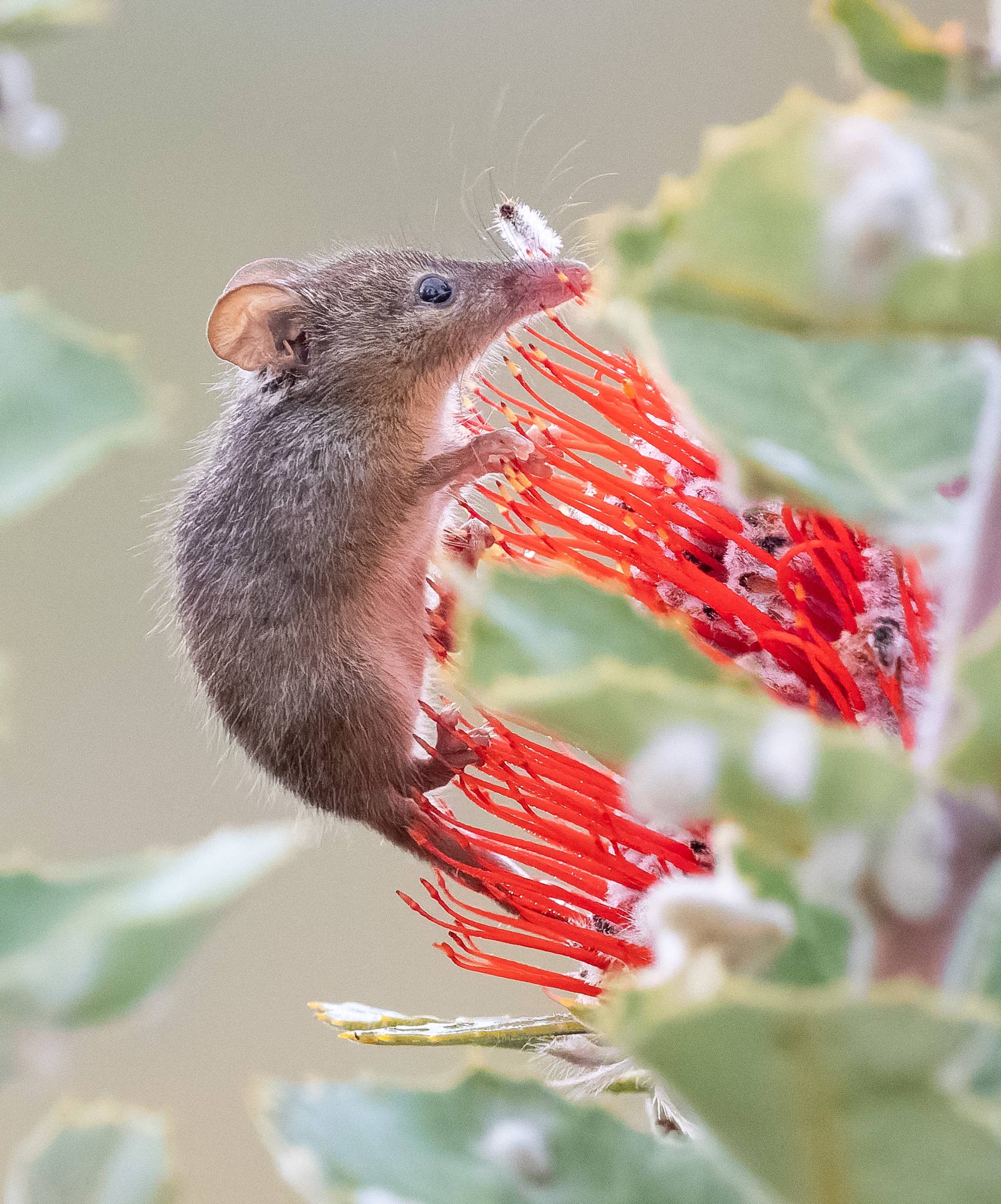

Conservation status
- Least Concern (IUCN 3.1)

Scientific classification
- Kingdom: Animalia
- Phylum: Chordata
- Class: Mammalia
- Infraclass: Marsupialia
- Order: Diprotodontia
- Suborder: Phalangeriformes
- Superfamily: Petauroidea
- Family: Tarsipedidae; Gervais & Verreaux, 1842
- Genus: Tarsipes; Gervais & Verreaux, 1842
- Species: T. rostratus

Binomial name
- Tarsipes rostratus Gervais & Verreaux, 1842
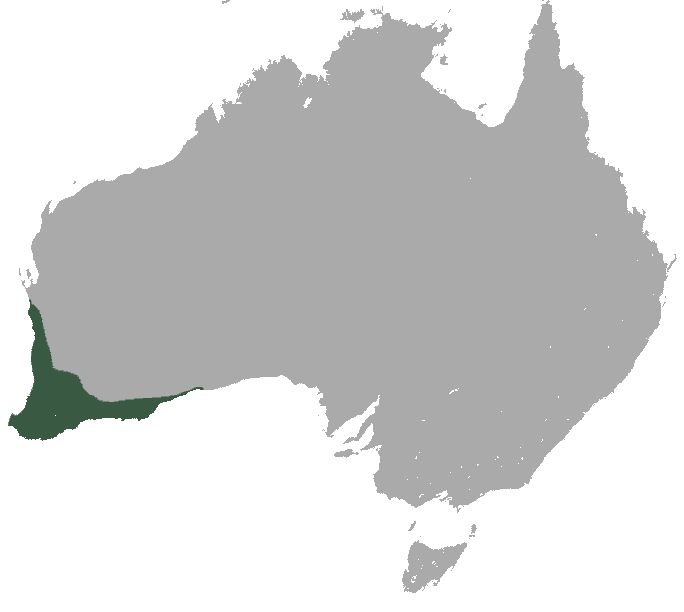
- Honey possum range

Synonyms
- Tarsipes spencerae Ride, 1970; Tarsipes spenserae Gray, 1842

= Honey possum =

Species of marsupial

The honey possum or noolbenger (Tarsipes rostratus), is a tiny species of marsupial in the genus Tarsipes, which is assigned to the monotypic diprotodont family Tarsipedidae. The name of the genus means "tarsier-foot", given for a resemblance to tarsier's simian-like feet and toes noted by the earliest descriptions.

This species feeds on the nectar and pollen of a diverse range of flowering plants. Endemic to southwest Australia, it is an important pollinator for such plants as Banksia attenuata, Banksia coccinea and Adenanthos cuneatus.

== Nomenclature ==
=== Common names ===
The common names include those cited or coined by Gilbert, Gould and Ellis Troughton, include honey phalanger, long-snouted phalanger, tait, and brown barred mouse. The term honey mouse was recorded by Troughton in 1922 as commonly used in the districts around King George Sound. An ethnographic survey of Noongar words recorded for the species found three names were in use, and proposed that these be standardized for spelling and pronunciation as ngoolboongoor (ngool'bong'oor), djebin (dje'bin) and dat, with ngoolboongoor being the origin of the name noolbenger.

=== Taxonomy ===
The first description of this diprotodont species was published by Paul Gervais and Jules Verreaux on 3 March 1842, referring to a specimen collected by Verreaux. The lectotype nominated for this species, held in the collection at National Museum of Natural History, France, was collected the Swan River Colony.

A description of a second species Tarsipes spenserae was published five days later by John Edward Gray; he was aware of the description prepared by Gervais, and thought his specimen represented a second species. The specific epithet honors his wife, whose maiden name was Eliza Lucy Spencer; she was the daughter of the government resident at King George Sound, Richard Spencer. Gray's specimen was provided by George Grey to the British Museum of Natural History, the skin of a male collected at King George Sound. This description was thought to have been published earlier by T. S. Palmer in 1904 and subsequently displaced the usage of T. rostratus. A taxonomic review by Mahoney in 1984 again reduced T. spenserae to a synonym for the species, as was the spelling emendation to spencerae cited by William Ride (1970) and others.

The poorly resolved phylogeny of higher-order marsupial relationships has sometimes lead to the species' separation into the superfamily Tarsipedoidea, though this was later abandoned in favour of grouping of South American and Australian marsupials into a clade that ignores the modern geographic remoteness of these continent's fauna.

The relationships of the monotypic family within the order Diprotodontia as a petauroid may be summarised as;

- Superfamily Petauroidea
  - Family Acrobatidae (gliders)
  - Family Pseudocheiridae (ringtail possums)
  - Family Petauridae (gliders and trioks)
  - Family Tarsipedidae
    - Genus Tarsipes
      - Tarsipes rostratus

Its sister taxon is thought to be Dromiciops gliroides, another small marsupial that occurs in South America and is known as the extant member of a genus that is represented in the Gondwanan fossil record. This was supported by phylogenetic analysis, but this is no longer believed to be true.

The honey possum's niche is thought to have become available around forty million years ago, when its preferred food plants diversified.

== Description ==
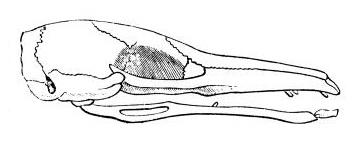
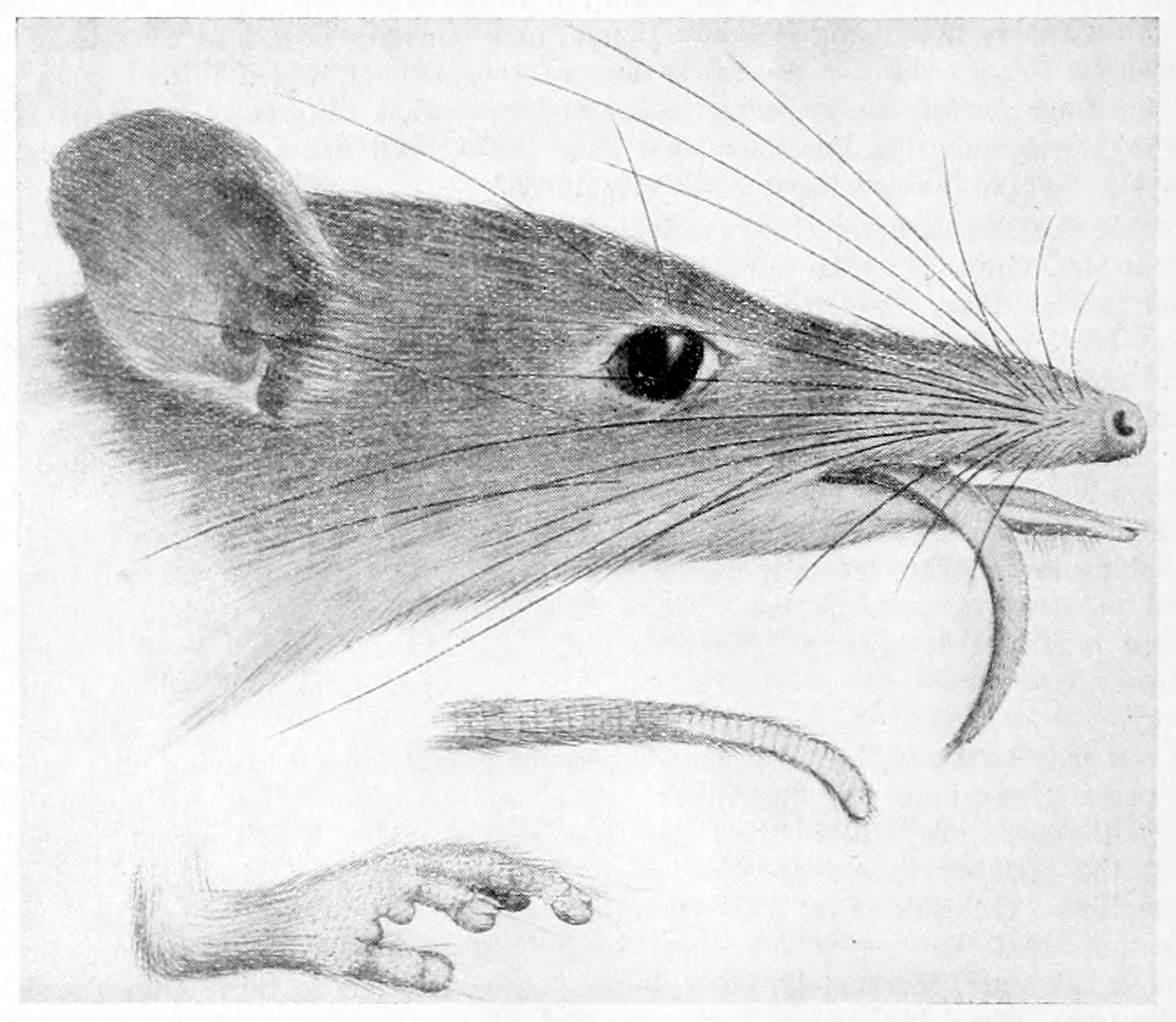
Anatomical detail of the head

Honey possums are small animals, somewhat resembling voles. Their pelage is a cream colour below that merges to rufous at the flanks, the overall coloration of the upperparts is a mix of brown and grey hairs. They are readily distinguished by their exceptionally long muzzle and three brown stripes from the head to the rump: a dark brown central stripe extends from the rump to a mid-point between the ears, this is a more distinct stripe than the two paler adjacent stripes. The length of the tail is from 70 to 100 millimetres (2.8 to 3.9 in), exceeding the combined body and head length of 65 to 85 mm (2.6 to 3.3 in); it is prehensile, assisting the animal in climbing. The recorded weight range for the species is 5 to 10 grams (0.18 to 0.35 oz). Male honey possums weigh just 7 to 11 g (0.25 to 0.39 oz), and females weigh 8 to 16 g (0.28 to 0.56 oz); about half the weight of a mouse. Their body length ranges from 6.5 to 9 cm (2.6 to 3.5 in).

The number of teeth are fewer and most much smaller than is typical for marsupials, with the molars reduced to tiny cones. The dental formula of I2/1 C1/0 P1/0 M3/3 totals no more than 22 teeth. The morphology of the elongated snout's jaws and dentition presents a number of unique characteristics suited to the specialisation as a palynivore and nectivore. Tarsipes' tongue is extensible and the end covered in brush-like papillae, with the redundant action of the modified or reduced teeth being replaced by the interaction of the tongue, keel-like lower incisors and a fine combing surface at the palate.

They have trichromat vision, similar to some other marsupials as well as primates but unlike most mammals which have dichromat vision. Their visual acuity is suited for detecting the bright yellow inflorescence of flowers such as Banksia attenuata.

They have a typical lifespan between one and two years.

== Distribution ==
Although restricted to a fairly small range in the southwest of Western Australia, it is locally common and does not seem to be threatened with extinction so long as its habitat of heath, shrubland, and woodland remains intact and diverse. Collection records held at the Western Australian Museum indicate they are more common in regions of high Proteaceae diversity, areas such as Banksia woodlands where species can be found flowering at all times of the year.

== Biology ==
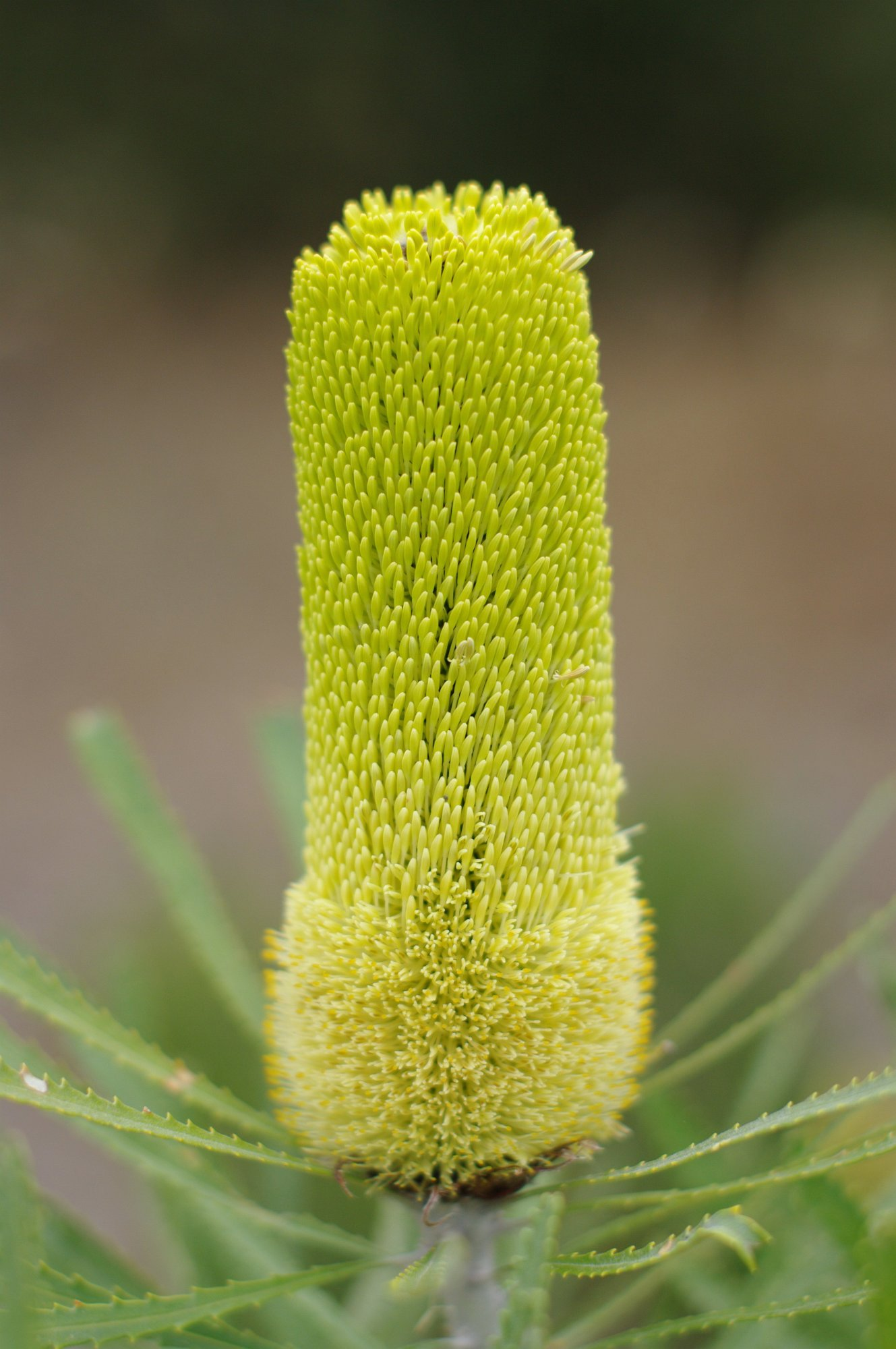
Bright yellow inflorescence of Banksia attenuata, thought to be the favourite of the honey mouse

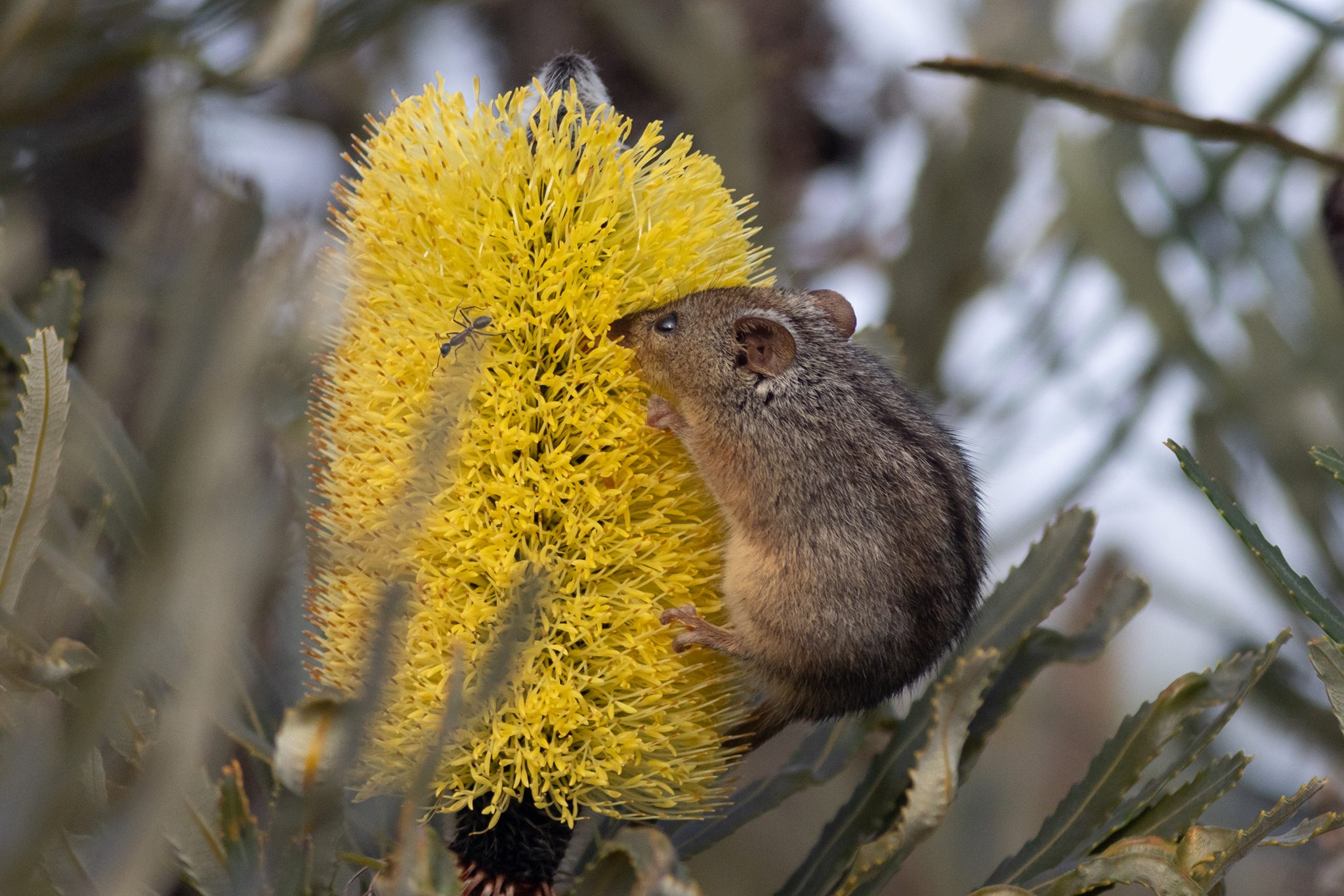

The honey possum is mainly nocturnal, but will come out to feed during daylight in cooler weather. Generally though, it spends the days asleep in a shelter of convenience: a rock cranny, a tree cavity, or an abandoned bird nest. In comparison to other marsupials of a similar size, T. rostratus has a high body temperature and metabolic rate that is termed euthermic. They are able to reduce their body temperature when exposed to cooler temperatures or experience a lack of food as they lack fat reserves; adverse condition induces one of two states of torpor in the species: the first is a shallow and brief period, similar to some dasyurids, where the body temperature is above 10–15 degrees Celsius (50–59 °F), and the second is a deeper state like burramyids that lasts for multiple days and reduces their temperature to less than 10 °C (50 °F).

Tarsipes rostratus is a keystone species in the ecology of the coastal sands of Southwest Australia, which house complex assemblages of plants known as kwongan. The plant species that provide nectar and pollen to T. rostratus are primarily genera of Proteaceae, Banksia and Adenanthos, and Myrtaceae, eucalypts and Agonis, and those of Epacridaceae, shrubby heath plants, although it is also known to visit the inflorescence of Anigozanthos, the kangaroo paws, and the tall spikes of Xanthorrhoea, the grass-trees. It is the only entirely nectarivorous mammal which is not a bat.

Their feeding activity involves visits to many individual plants; their head often carries a small pollen load that can be conveyed more effectively than the birds that visit the same flowers. The favoured species Banksia attenuata appears to be obliged to this animal as a pollination vector, and both species have evolved to suit their mutualistic interactions. Study of the amount of nectar and pollen has concluded that a nine-gram individual requires around 7 ml (0.25 imp fl oz; 0.24 US fl oz) of nectar and 1 g (0.035 oz) of pollen each day to maintain an energetic balance. This amount of pollen provides sufficient nitrogen for the species high activity metabolism, and the additional nitrogen requirements of females during lactation is available in the pollen of Banksia species. The ingestion of excess water when feeding at wet flowers, a frequent circumstance in the high rainfall regions of its range, is compensated by its kidneys, which can process up to two times the animal's body weight in water which is subsequently eliminated. Pollen grains are digested over the course of six hours, extracting almost all the nutrients they contain.

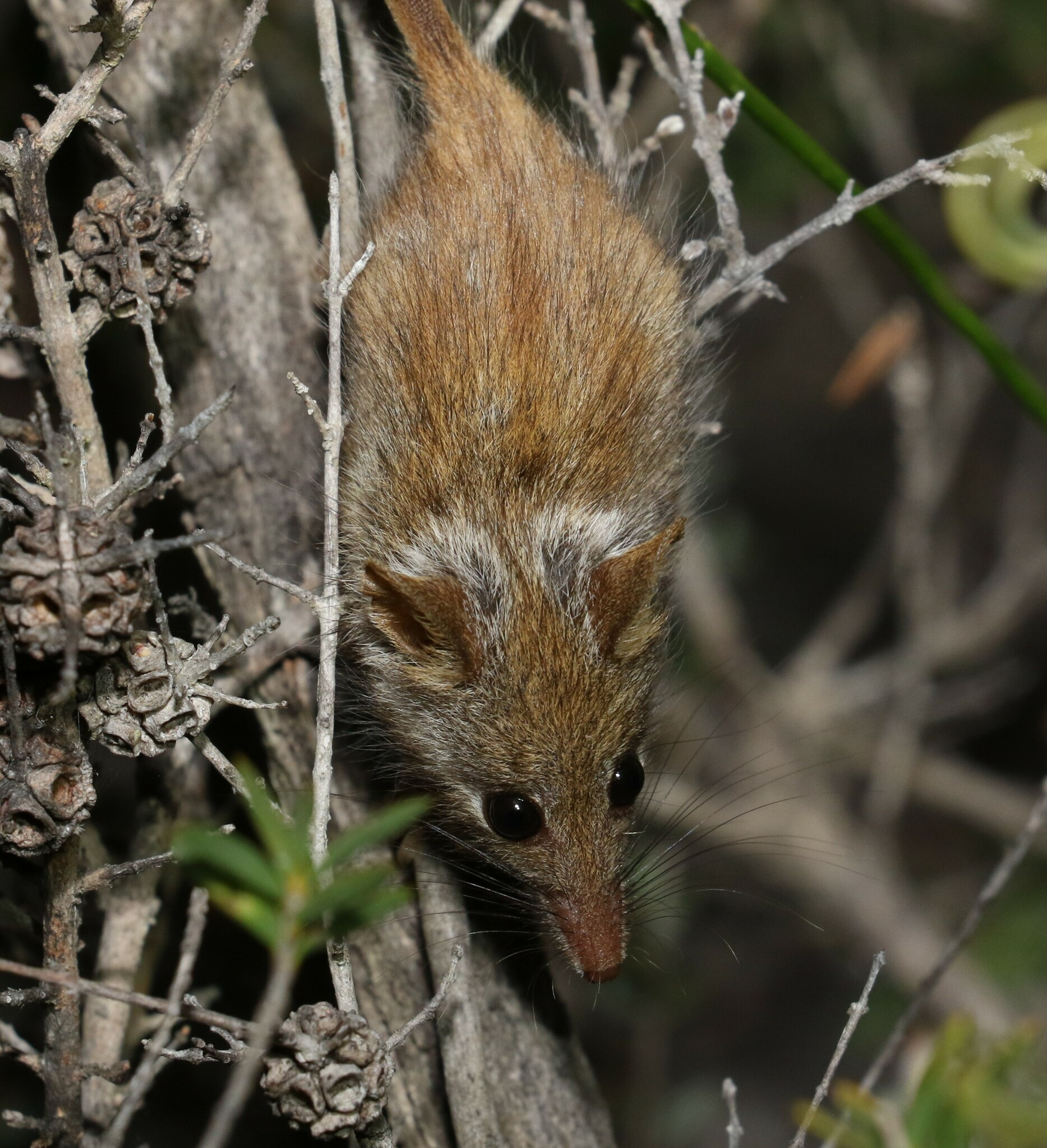
Climbing downwards

The species is able to climb with the assistance of its long prehensile tail and an opposable first toe at the long hindfoot that is able to grip like a monkey's paw. The bristle-like papillae at the upper surface of the tongue increase in length toward the tip, and this is used to gather the pollen and nectar by rapidly wiping it into the inflorescence. Both its front and back feet are adept at grasping, enabling it to climb trees with ease, as well as traverse the undergrowth at speed. Radio-tracking has shown that males particularly are quite mobile, moving distances of up to 0.5 km (0.3 mi) in a night and use areas averaging 0.8 hectares (2.0 acres). Some evidence indicates even greater distances; pollen found on an individual in a study area was from a banksia not found within 3 kilometres (1.9 mi) of the collection site.

Most of the time, honey possums stick to separate territories of about 1 ha (2.5 acres) outside of the breeding season. They live in small groups of no more than 10, which results in them engaging in combat with one another only rarely. During the breeding season, females move into smaller areas with their young, which they will defend fiercely, especially from any males.

=== Reproduction ===
Breeding depends on the availability of nectar and can occur at any time of the year. Females are promiscuous, mating with a large number of males and may simultaneously carry embryos from different progenitors. Competition has led to the males having very large testicles relatively; at a relative mass of 4.2-4.6% to body weight it is amongst the largest known for a mammal. Their sperm is the largest in the mammal world, measuring 365 micrometres with a tail/flagellum length of 360 micrometres, also cited as the longest known.

The development of blastocysts corresponds to day length, induced by a shorter photoperiod, but other reproductive processes are prompted by other factor, probably food availability. Gestation lasts for 28 days, with two to four young being produced. At birth, they are the smallest of any mammal, weighing 0.005 grams (0.00018 oz). Nurturing and development within the pouch lasts for about 60 days, after which they emerge covered in fur and with open eyes, weighing some 2.5 g (0.088 oz). As soon as they emerge, they are often left in a sheltered area (such as a hollow in a tree) while the mother searches for food for herself, but within days, they learn to grab hold of the mother's back and travel with her. Eventually, their weight soon becomes too much, and they stop nursing at around 11 weeks, and start to make their own homes shortly thereafter. As is common in marsupials, a second litter is often born when the pouch is vacated by the first, with fertilised embryos being stopped from developing.

=== Ecology ===
The effect of wildfire frequency on the population was evaluated in a study over a twenty three-year period, giving indications of resilience of the species to the first fire in the area and a subsequent burn six years later. The effect of increased frequency and intensity of fire, due to global warming and prescribed burns can adversely affect the suitability of the local habitat.

The species is susceptible to the impact of Phytophthora cinnamomi, a soil-borne fungal-like species that is associated with forest dieback in the eucalypt forests and banksia woodlands of the region. The flowers of the nine plant species most favoured by T. rostratus provide food throughout the year, and five of these are vulnerable to the withering condition caused by P. cinnamomi pathogen.

== Relation to humans ==
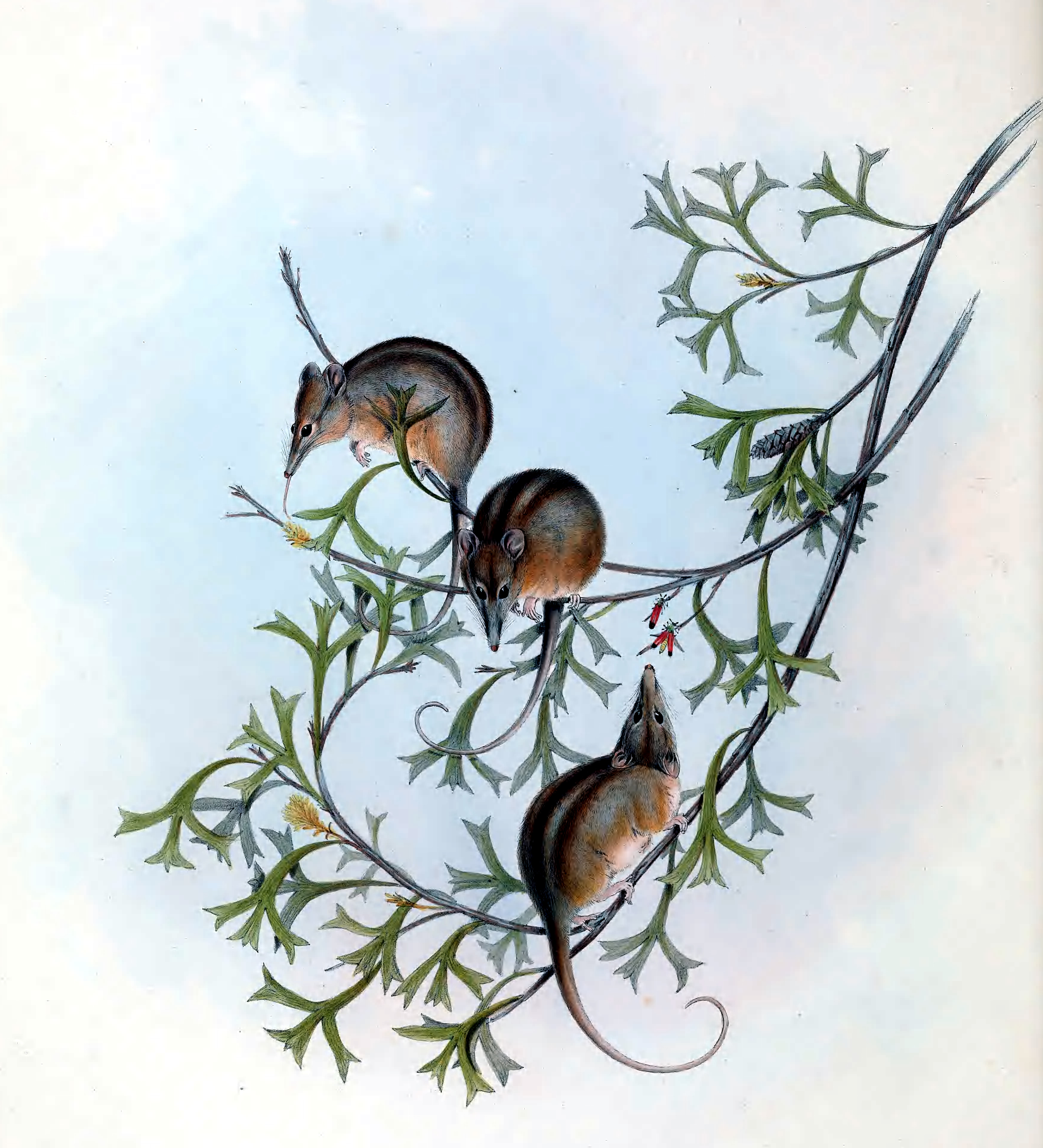
Illustration by Gould and Richter, 1863

The first report of the species was compiled by John Gilbert, the careful and thorough field collector commissioned by Gould to travel to the new colony at the Swan River on the west coast of Australia. Gilbert obtained access to Noongar informants that provided him with the names and details of the animal's habits and, with some difficulty, four specimens for scientific examination. Both he and Gould recognised the unique characters of the unknown species.

The next major field study was undertaken by the mammalogist Ellis Troughton at the suggestion of H. L. White, who provided an introduction to the professional collector F. Lawson Whitlock. Troughton's visit to King George Sound was guided by Whitlock to the source of a specimen he had sent to White, a man in the same region named David Morgan who accommodated the biologist while he searched extensively and unsuccessfully for further specimens. Troughton was eventually provided with a series of a dozen specimens when he was preparing to leave the Port of Albany, a collection assembled over many years by the cats of Hugh Leishman at Nannarup. The collection of the Australian Museum was increased when Morgan continued to forward specimens to Troughton, firstly with two pregnant females that were also killed by a cat, and then with a report of living animals he was able to maintain in captivity for five to six weeks. Morgan reported that his cat would bring a mangled specimen on a daily basis for a period of time, and observed it seeking them in a flowering shrub at dusk, but thought their local appearance was seasonally related and became absent outside the breeding season.

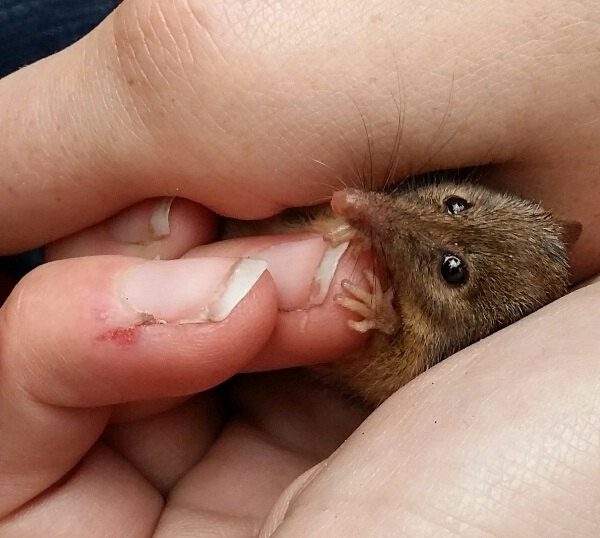
Being held

The population structure and feeding habits of T. rostratus was poorly understood until a biological study at the Fitzgerald River National Park was completed in 1984. Closer study of the reproductive processes was allowed by the capture, extended observation and dissection of the species in university programs, the first success in captivity beginning in 1974. Examination of the reproductive strategies has allowed comparison to the other modern marsupial families, in particular the evolution of embryonic diapause.

Honey possums continue to be an iconic animal to the people of the region, and was selected by Amok Island to feature in a large public art project on silos in the wheatbelt.
