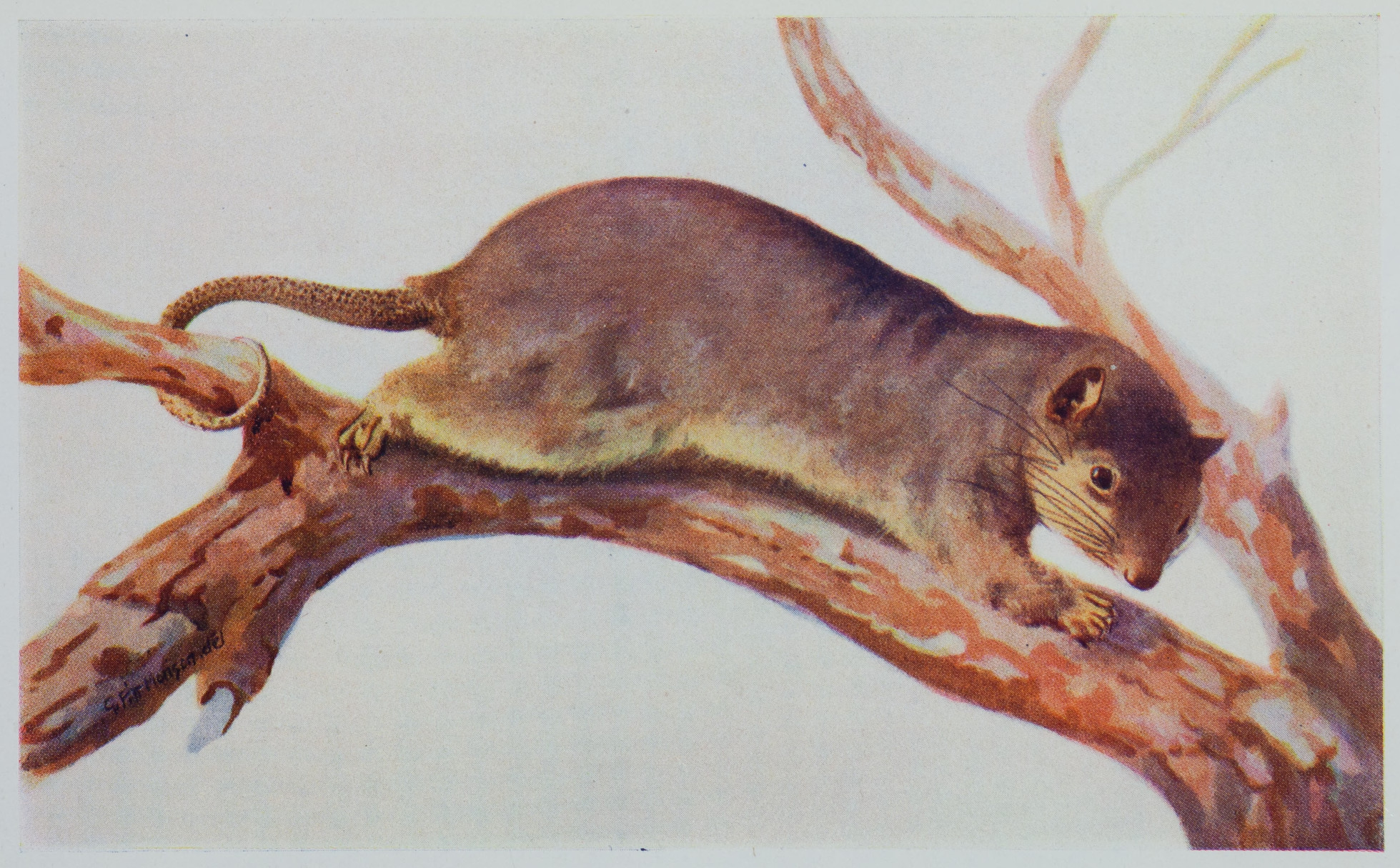
- Wyulda squamicaudata

Scientific classification
- Kingdom: Animalia
- Phylum: Chordata
- Class: Mammalia
- Infraclass: Marsupialia
- Order: Diprotodontia
- Family: Phalangeridae
- Genus: Wyulda; Alexander, 1918

Type species
- Wyulda squamicaudata Alexander, 1918

Species
- Wyulda squamicaudata; †Wyulda asherjoeli

= Wyulda =

Wyulda Temporal range: Early Miocene - Recent

Genus of marsupial

Wyulda is a genus of phalanger. The scaly-tailed possum is the only extant species, but a single extinct species (Wyulda asherjoeli) from the Miocene is known as well.
