= Masked ringtail possum =

Conservation status
- Least Concern (IUCN 3.1)

Scientific classification
- Kingdom: Animalia
- Phylum: Chordata
- Class: Mammalia
- Infraclass: Marsupialia
- Order: Diprotodontia
- Family: Pseudocheiridae
- Genus: Pseudochirulus
- Species: P. larvatus

Binomial name
- Pseudochirulus larvatus (Forster & Rothschild, 1911)
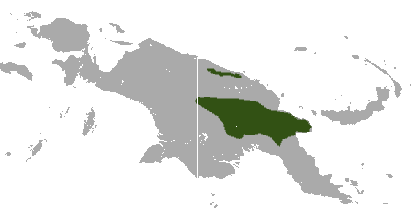
- Masked ringtail possum range

Species of marsupial

The masked ringtail possum (Pseudochirulus larvatus) is a marsupial possum of the family Pseudocheiridae. It inhabits tropical and subtropical forests in Indonesia and Papua New Guinea. Masked ringtails are arboreal residents of various forest ecosystems. This species is sometimes classified as a subpopulation of P. forbesi; however, it has a separate range.

== Taxonomy ==
The masked ringtail possum was initially was described in 1911 as Phalanger larvatus.

== Morphology ==
The coloration of the type specimen was described as below:

"Fur of pelage variety, smoky grey, an ill-defined mesial dorsal line or stripe of dark brown expanding into a distinct smoky black band over head and face to the nose. Throat black, a black band from throat across cheeks to ears, a similar one on crown between the ears. Snout smoky black; face tawny ochraceous. Forearms washed with tawny ochraceous on outside. Underside dirty grey, paler in

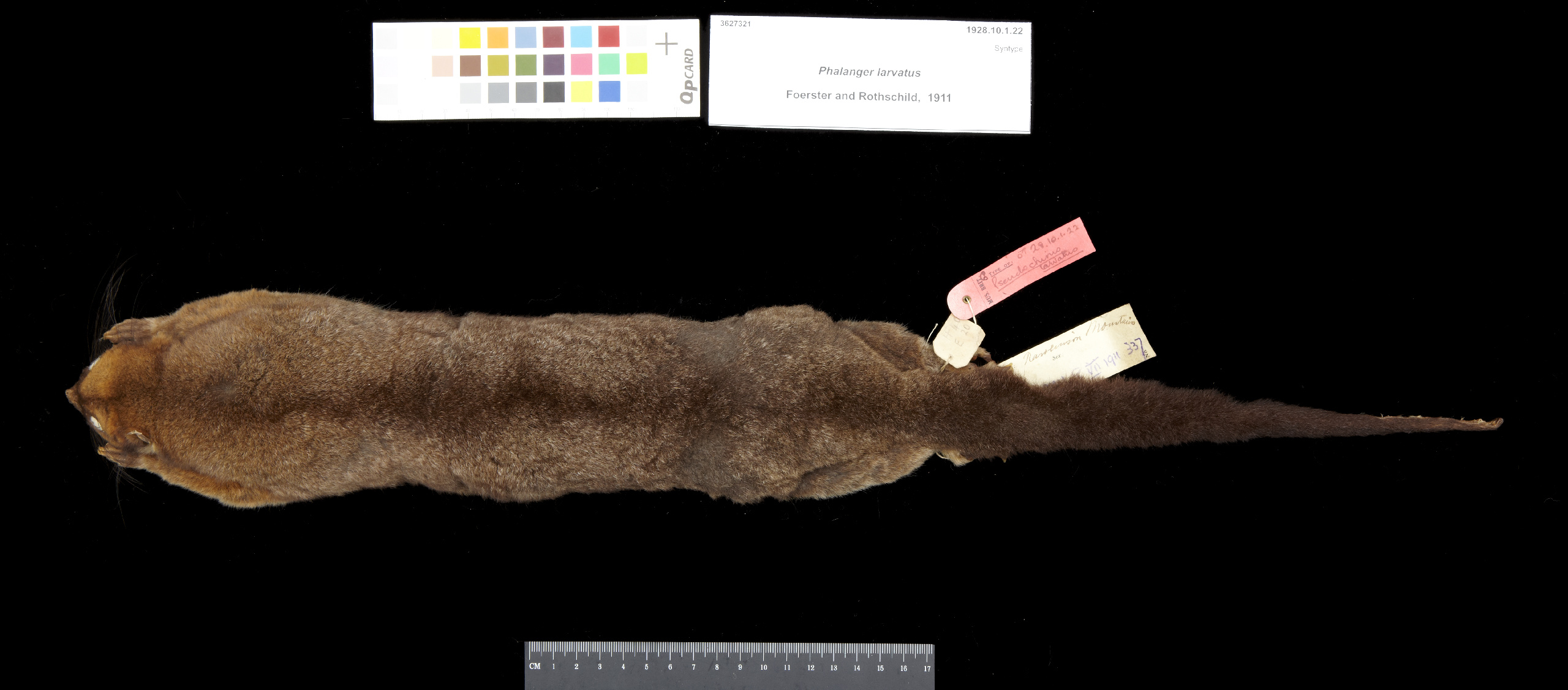
Syntype of a juvenile male collected in 1924 by C Keysser. From the collection of the Natural History Museum in London.

centre; chest and lower throat yellowish white. Tail hairy to tip, black, with a few scattered silky grey hairs at base; underside of the tail naked for the apical 120mm [12cm]."

The head and body of the type specimen were 34cm long. The tail was 23-25cm long. An adult masked ringtail possum weights around 600-800g.

== Habitat ==
P. larvatus inhabits tropical and subtropical forests in Indonesia and Papua New Guinea. It has been documented in northeastern New Guinea in the Star Mountains, the eastern Central Cordillera, the Huon Peninsula and the northern coast ranges. It appears to favor disturbed and secondary forests.

== Interaction with humans ==
A biodiversity survey of the Hindenburg Wall in Papua New Guinea published in 2015 noted that P. larvatus is hunted as a game animal by native populations. The natives described a nocturnal marsupial with brown and white facial spots called a Botok in the local language; the surveyors noted that this description fit P. larvatus. The Botok was regarded as "the keeper of the garden of the mammals."
