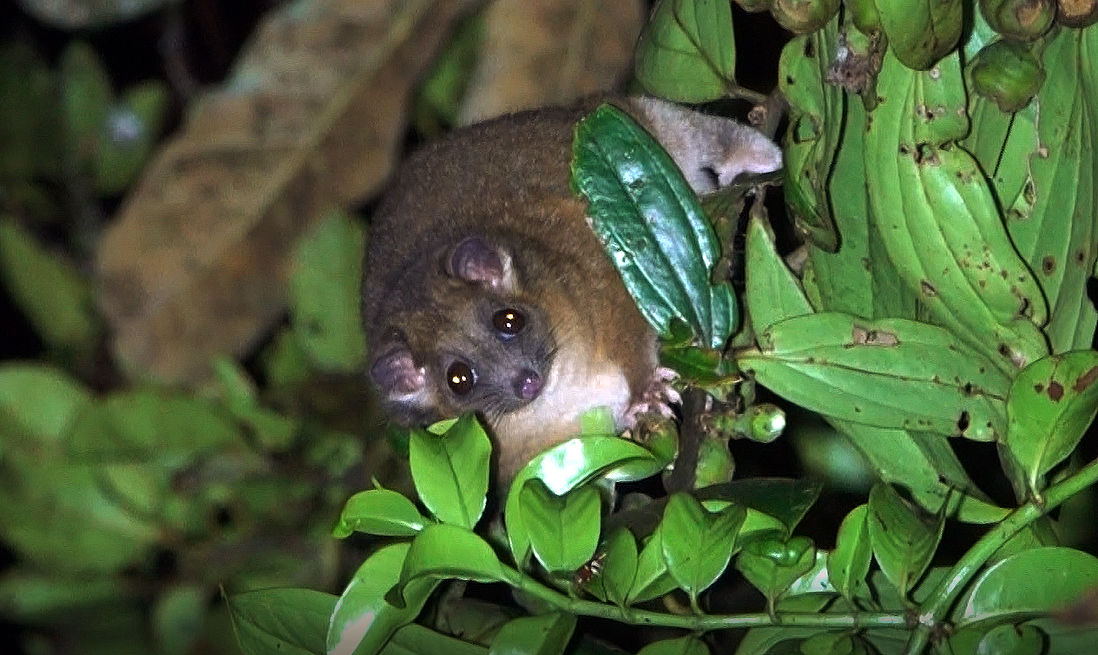

Conservation status
- Least Concern (IUCN 3.1)

Scientific classification
- Kingdom: Animalia
- Phylum: Chordata
- Class: Mammalia
- Infraclass: Marsupialia
- Order: Diprotodontia
- Family: Pseudocheiridae
- Genus: Pseudochirulus
- Species: P. mayeri

Binomial name
- Pseudochirulus mayeri (Rothschild & Dollman, 1932)
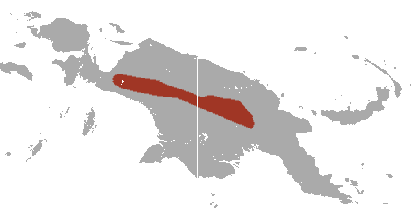
- Pygmy ringtail possum range

Synonyms
- Pseudocheirus mayeri (Rothschild & Dollman, 1932)

= Pygmy ringtail possum =

Species of marsupial

The pygmy ringtail possum (Pseudochirulus mayeri) is a species of marsupial in the family Pseudocheiridae. It is found in the montane forest regions of Papua New Guinea and West Papua, Indonesia. They are "widespread along the Central Cordillera" and live at elevations between 1,500 and 3,600 metres (4,900 and 11,800 ft) above sea level."

Pygmy ringtails are herbivores or "arboreal folivores" that eat pollen, lichen, fungus and "epiphytic moss." P. mayeri also eat the bark of trees, which provides them with calcium and potassium. They have "large incisor" teeth which help with "clipping forage from plants" and have "selenodont molars" that help with "shredding ingested foliage." They have "an enlarged cecum that acts as a fermentation chamber" and allows "gut bacteria to breakdown [sic] plant tissue." The extra retention time allows the pygmy ringtail to obtain more nutrients from the ingested forage.

== Characteristics ==
Pseudochirulus mayeri is a very small species, with the males being slightly smaller than the females. The average female weight is 154.5 grams, ranging from 105 to 206 grams, while the average length is 372 mm with a range of 330–400 mm. The male weighs approximately 149 grams ranging between 115 and 178 grams and an average length of 344 mm with a range of 318–369 mm. Their life expectancy in the wild is approximately 4 or 5 years. These specific pygmy ringtails have "cinnamon brown to dark brown" fur with a visible "bluish-gray undercoat" when they move. Their tail has thick brown hair on top while calloused and hairless underneath. The Pseudochirulus mayeri also have "an opposable first toe on their hind feet, and their second and third toes are syndactylus."

These possums make dreys, or nests, "in the forks of trees, less than four meters off the ground." These nests consist of foliage similar to moss and lichen and they enter into "state[s] of partial torpor" during the day. Therefore, they "are nocturnal, solitary, arboreal herbivores" that do not travel far at night from their drey because they are small and slow moving. P. mayeri can use sound to communicate. For example, young P. mayeri "use a twitter-like call when in search [for] their mother and make a screeching noise as an alarm call." However, they mainly communicate with one another through their olfactory. For example, males produce a pheromone in the sternal gland that "[deter]s other males" while both females and males "establish home ranges" or "display reproductive status [using] feces and pheromones."

== Predators ==
The main predators of P. mayeri are owls, specifically the greater sooty owl, Papuan hawk-owl, eastern grass-owl and rufous owl. They also tend to be hunted by indigenous people who live near their habitat. However, they are not sufficiently hunted to be considered threatened.
