= Pseudochirulus =

Scientific classification
- Kingdom: Animalia
- Phylum: Chordata
- Class: Mammalia
- Infraclass: Marsupialia
- Order: Diprotodontia
- Family: Pseudocheiridae
- Subfamily: Pseudocheirinae
- Genus: Pseudochirulus; Matschie, 1915

Type species
- Phalangista (Pseudocheirus) canescens Waterhouse, 1845

Species
- Pseudochirulus canescens; Pseudochirulus caroli; Pseudochirulus cinereus; Pseudochirulus forbesi; Pseudochirulus herbertensis; Pseudochirulus larvatus; Pseudochirulus mayeri; Pseudochirulus schlegeli

Genus of marsupials

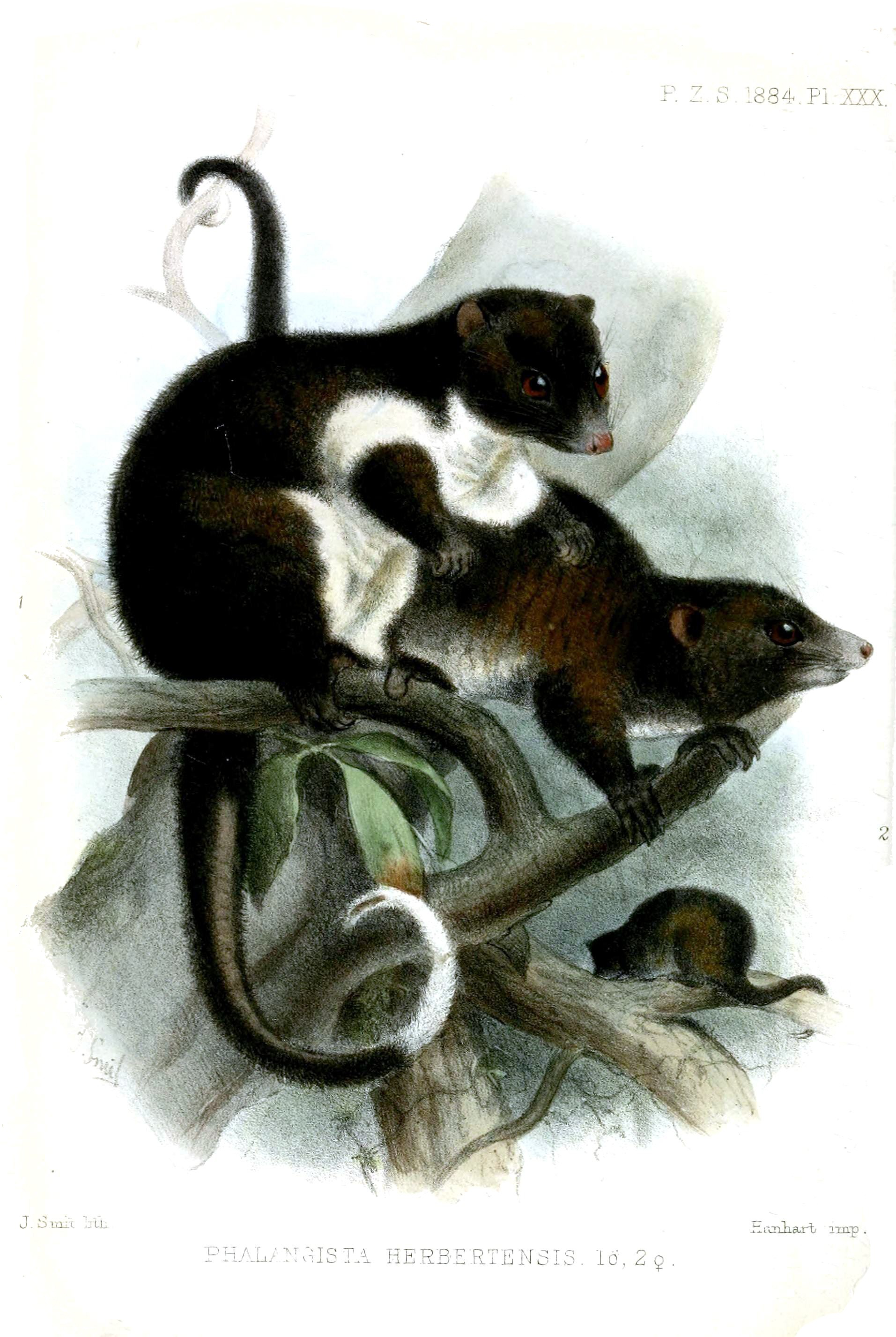
Pseudochirulus herbertensis

Slender ringtail possum or Small ringtail possum (Pseudochirulus), also known as the ringtail possum, is a genus of marsupial in the family Pseudocheiridae native to Indonesia, Papua New Guinea and Queensland, Australia. Pseudochirulus live on trees and their diet mainly consists of leaves. The ringtail possums are related to five other genera Hemibelideus, Petauroides, Petropseudes, Pseudocheirus and Pseudochirops.

== Species ==
It contains the following species:

- Lowland ringtail possum, Pseudochirulus canescens
- Weyland ringtail possum, Pseudochirulus caroli
- Cinereus ringtail possum, Pseudochirulus cinereus
- Painted ringtail possum, Pseudochirulus forbesi
- Herbert River ringtail possum, Pseudochirulus herbertensis
- Masked ringtail possum, Pseudochirulus larvatus
- Pygmy ringtail possum, Pseudochirulus mayeri
- Vogelkop ringtail possum, Pseudochirulus schlegeli
