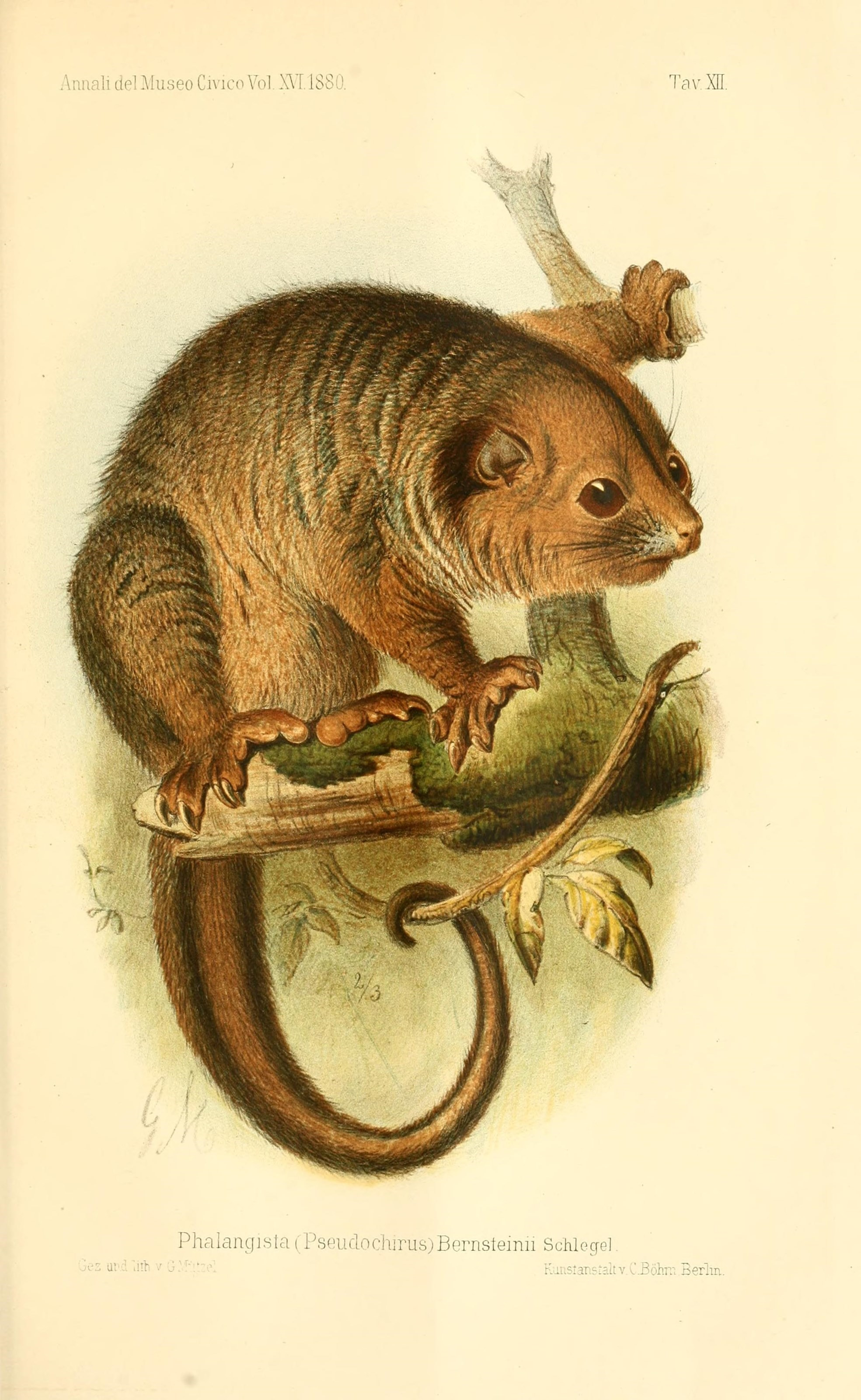

Conservation status
- Least Concern (IUCN 3.1)

Scientific classification
- Kingdom: Animalia
- Phylum: Chordata
- Class: Mammalia
- Infraclass: Marsupialia
- Order: Diprotodontia
- Family: Pseudocheiridae
- Genus: Pseudochirulus
- Species: P. canescens

Binomial name
- Pseudochirulus canescens (Waterhouse, 1846)
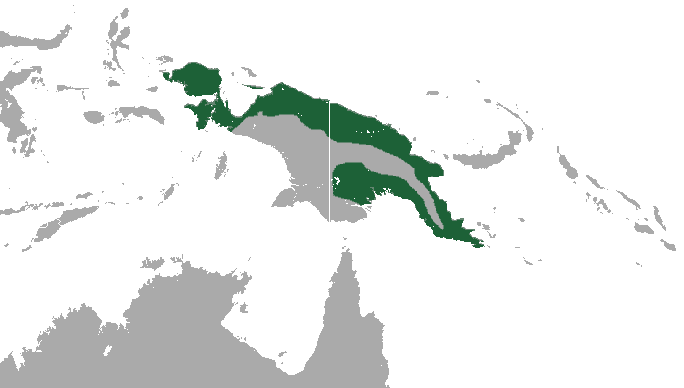
- Lowland ringtail possum range

Synonyms
- Pseudocheirus canescens (Waterhouse, 1846)

= Lowland ringtail possum =

Species of marsupial

The lowland ringtail possum (Pseudochirulus canescens) is a species of marsupial in the family Pseudocheiridae. It is found in Indonesia, the Solomon Islands, and Papua New Guinea.
