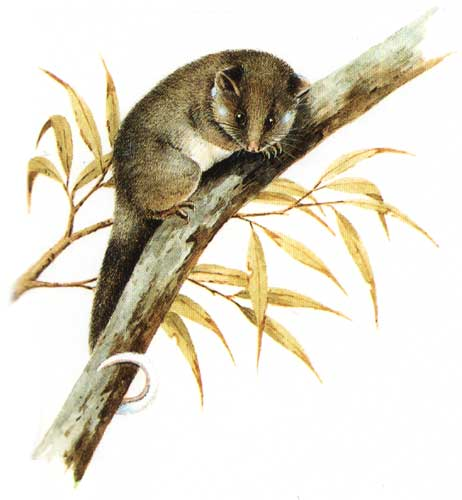
- Pseudocheirus peregrinus, common ringtail possum

Scientific classification
- Kingdom: Animalia
- Phylum: Chordata
- Class: Mammalia
- Infraclass: Marsupialia
- Order: Diprotodontia
- Superfamily: Petauroidea
- Family: Pseudocheiridae; Winge, 1893

Type genus
- Pseudocheirus Ogilby, 1837

Subfamilies
- Hemibelideinae; Pseudocheirinae; Pseudochiropsinae
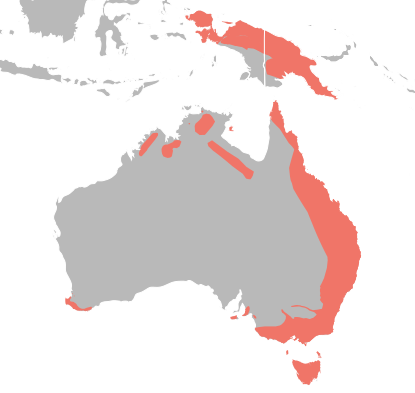
- Pseudocheiridae distribution

= Pseudocheiridae =

Pseudocheiridae Temporal range: Late Oligocene to Recent

Family of marsupials

Pseudocheiridae is a family of arboreal marsupials containing 17 extant species of ringtailed possums and close relatives. They are found in forested areas and shrublands throughout Australia and New Guinea.

== Characteristics ==
Physically, they appear very similar to the pygmy possums, except for their greater size. Even so, they are relatively small animals, with the largest being cat-sized, and they weigh between 200 grams and 2 kilograms. They have grasping hands and feet with opposable first toes on their hindfeet, and, in all species save the greater glider, a prehensile tail. They are nocturnal, with large eyes.

All species feed almost entirely on leaves. To enable them to digest this tough and fibrous food, they have an enlarged cecum containing fermenting bacteria, and, like rabbits, they are coprophagous, passing food through their digestive tracts twice. Their teeth include a battery of grinding molars, and they lack lower canines. Their dental formula is:

Dentition
3.1.3.4
2.0.3.4

Most are solitary animals, although a few live in small family groups, and they are generally shy and secretive, making them difficult to study. They travel across home ranges of up to 3 hectares (7.5 acres). Gestation lasts up to 50 days, but varies depending on species.

== Classification ==
The listing for extant species is based on The Third edition of Wilson & Reeder's Mammal Species of the World (2005), except where the Mammal Diversity Database and IUCN agree on a change. The 21 living species of pseudocheirid possum are grouped into three subfamilies and seven genera.

- †Pildra
- †Paljara
- †Marlu
- †Pseudokoala
- Subfamily Hemibelideinae
  - Genus Hemibelideus
    - Lemur-like ringtail possum, Hemibelideus lemuroides
  - Genus Tous
    - Ring-tailed glider, Tous ayamaruensis
  - Genus Petauroides
    - Central greater glider, Petauroides armillatus
    - Northern greater glider, Petauroides minor
    - Southern greater glider, Petauroides volans
- Subfamily Pseudocheirinae
  - Genus Petropseudes
    - Rock-haunting ringtail possum, Petropseudes dahli
  - Genus Pseudocheirus
    - Common ringtail possum, Pseudocheirus peregrinus
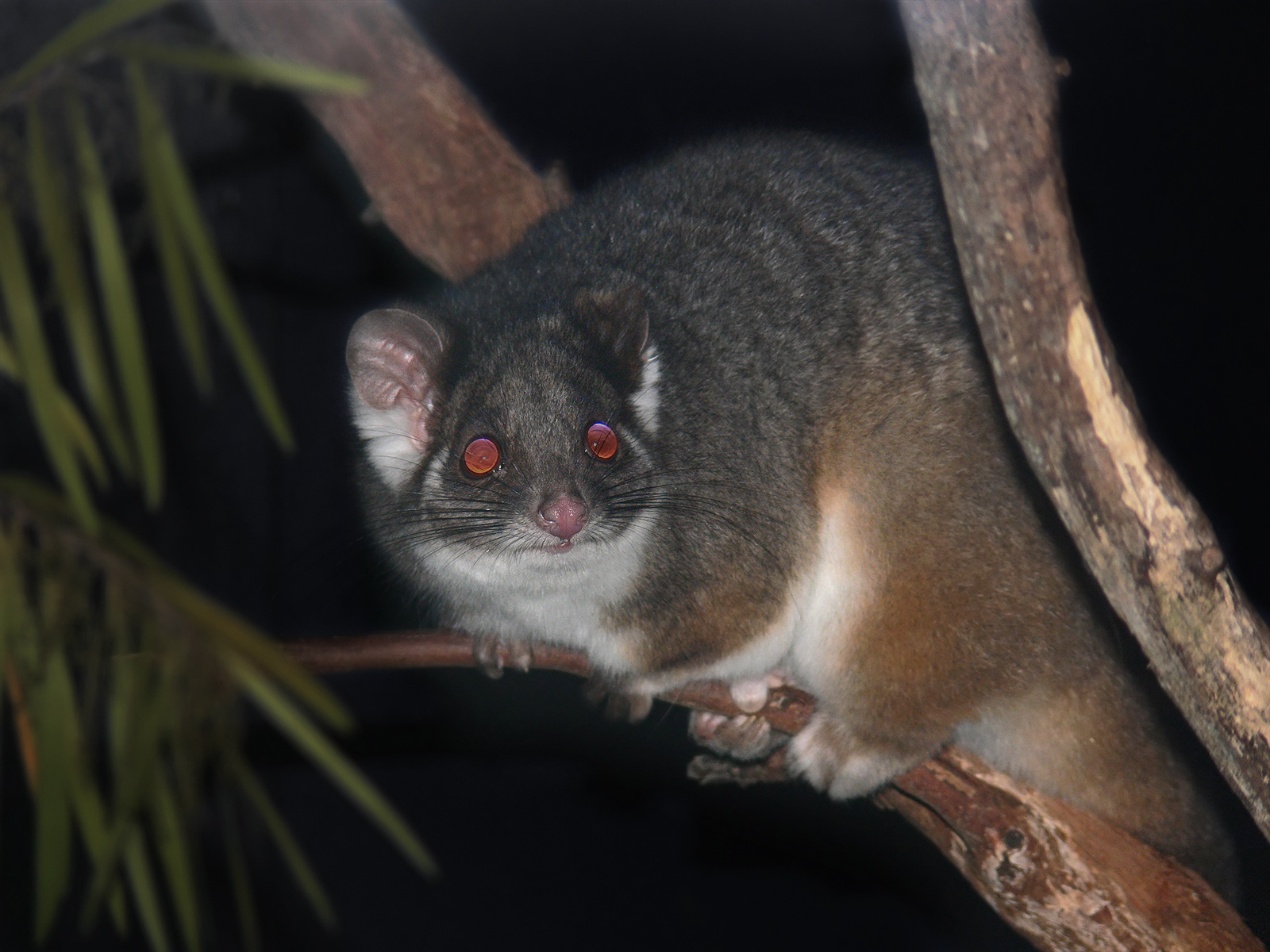
      Common ringtail possum
    - Western ringtail possum, Pseudocheirus occidentalis
  - Genus Pseudochirulus
    - Lowland ringtail possum, Pseudochirulus canescens
    - Weyland ringtail possum, Pseudochirulus caroli
    - Cinereus ringtail possum, Pseudochirulus cinereus
    - Painted ringtail possum, Pseudochirulus forbesi
    - Herbert River ringtail possum, Pseudochirulus herbertensis
    - Masked ringtail possum, Pseudochirulus larvatus
    - Pygmy ringtail possum, Pseudochirulus mayeri
    - Vogelkop ringtail possum, Pseudochirulus schlegeli
- Subfamily Pseudochiropsinae
  - Genus Pseudochirops
    - D'Albertis' ringtail possum, Pseudochirops albertisii
    - Green ringtail possum, Pseudochirops archeri
    - Plush-coated ringtail possum, Pseudochirops corinnae
    - Reclusive ringtail possum, Pseudochirops coronatus
    - Coppery ringtail possum, Pseudochirops cupreus
    - †Pseudochirops winteri
