= Vogelkop ringtail possum =

Conservation status
- Vulnerable (IUCN 3.1)

Scientific classification
- Kingdom: Animalia
- Phylum: Chordata
- Class: Mammalia
- Infraclass: Marsupialia
- Order: Diprotodontia
- Family: Pseudocheiridae
- Genus: Pseudochirulus
- Species: P. schlegeli

Binomial name
- Pseudochirulus schlegeli (Jentink, 1884)
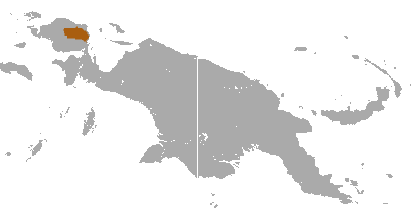
- Vogelkop ringtail possum range

Synonyms
- Pseudochirulus schlegeli (Jentink, 1884)

Species of marsupial

The Vogelkop ringtail possum (Pseudochirulus schlegeli) is a species of marsupial in the family Pseudocheiridae. It is endemic to the Vogelkop Peninsula, West Papua, Indonesia.
