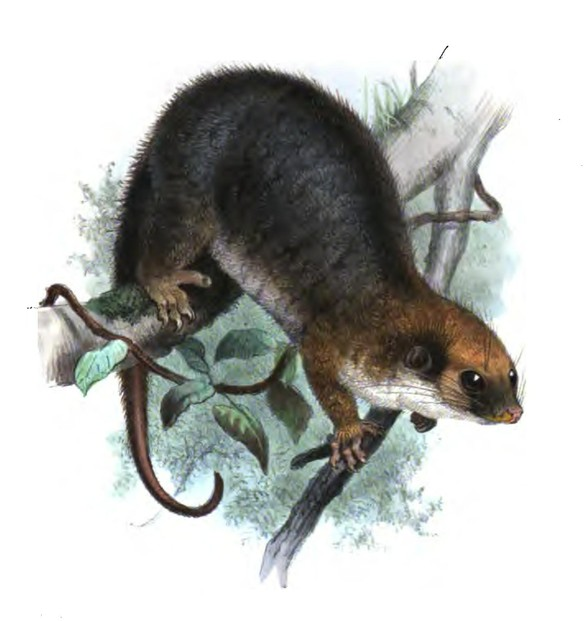

Conservation status
- Least Concern (IUCN 3.1)

Scientific classification
- Kingdom: Animalia
- Phylum: Chordata
- Class: Mammalia
- Infraclass: Marsupialia
- Order: Diprotodontia
- Family: Pseudocheiridae
- Genus: Pseudochirulus
- Species: P. forbesi

Binomial name
- Pseudochirulus forbesi (Thomas, 1887)
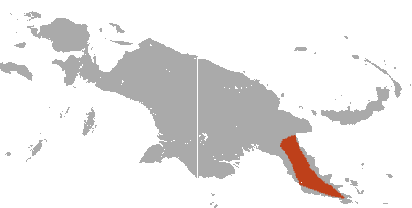
- Painted ringtail possum range

Synonyms
- Pseudocheirus forbesi (Thomas, 1887)

= Painted ringtail possum =

Species of marsupial

The painted ringtail possum or moss-forest ringtail possum (Pseudochirulus forbesi) is a species of marsupial in the family Pseudocheiridae. It inhabits montane forests between altitudes of 450 to 3800 metres throughout the Huon Peninsula montane rain forests, Central Range montane rain forests and Huon Peninsula montane rain forests of Papua New Guinea. It has a diet of primarily leaves, including those of Medinilla.

== Names ==
It is known as skoyd or boñay in the Kalam language of Papua New Guinea.
