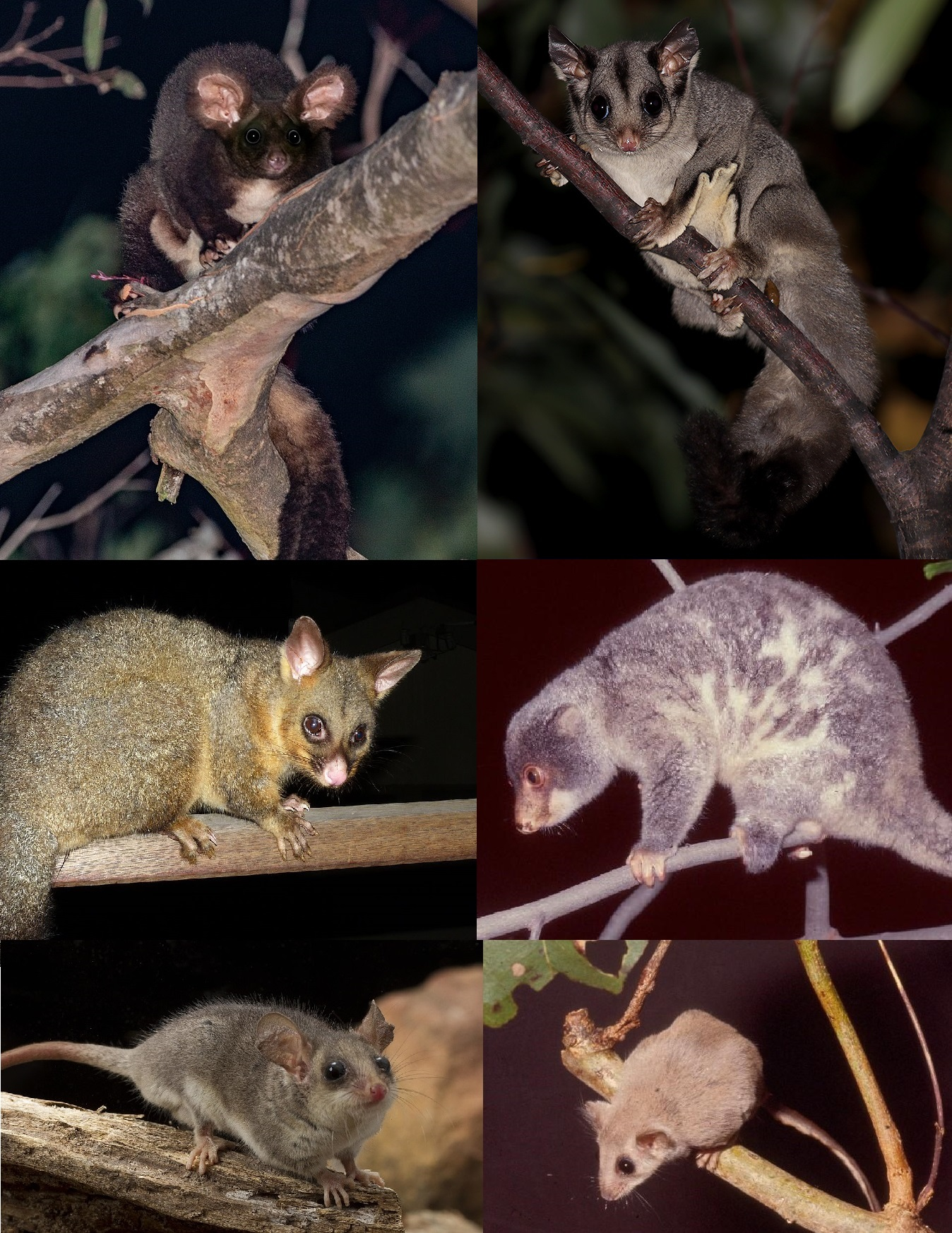

Scientific classification
- Kingdom: Animalia
- Phylum: Chordata
- Class: Mammalia
- Infraclass: Marsupialia
- Order: Diprotodontia
- Suborder: Phalangeriformes; Szalay in Archer, 1982

Groups included
- Phalangeroidea; †Ektopodontidae; Burramyidae; Phalangeridae; Petauroidea; Pseudocheiridae; Petauridae; Tarsipedidae; Acrobatidae

Cladistically included but traditionally excluded taxa
- Macropodiformes

= Phalangeriformes =

Phalangeriformes Temporal range: Oligocene–present

Suborder of arboreal marsupials

Phalangeriformes /fəˈlændʒərɪfɔːrmiːz/ are quadrupedal marsupials with long tails. They are a paraphyletic suborder of Diprotodontia, consisting of about 70 species of small to medium-sized marsupials native to Australia, New Guinea, and Sulawesi. It includes possums, gliders, and cuscus.

Phalangeriformes species are typically nocturnal and at least partially arboreal. They mostly inhabit vegetated habitats, and several species have adjusted well to urban settings. Diets range from generalist herbivores or omnivores (the common brushtail possum) to specialist browsers of eucalyptus (greater glider), insectivores (mountain pygmy possum) and nectar-feeders (honey possum).

The smallest phalangeriforme species, indeed the smallest diprotodont marsupial, is the Tasmanian pygmy possum, with an adult head-body length of 70 mm (2 3/4 in) and a weight of 10 g (3/8 oz). The largest are the two species of bear cuscus, which may exceed 7 kg (15 lb 7 oz).

The common name "possum" for various Phalangeriformes species derives from the creatures' resemblance to the opossums of the Americas (the term comes from Powhatan language aposoum "white animal", from Proto-Algonquian *wa·p-aʔɬemwa "white dog"). However, although opossums are also marsupials, Australasian possums are more closely related to other Australasian marsupials such as kangaroos.

== Classification ==
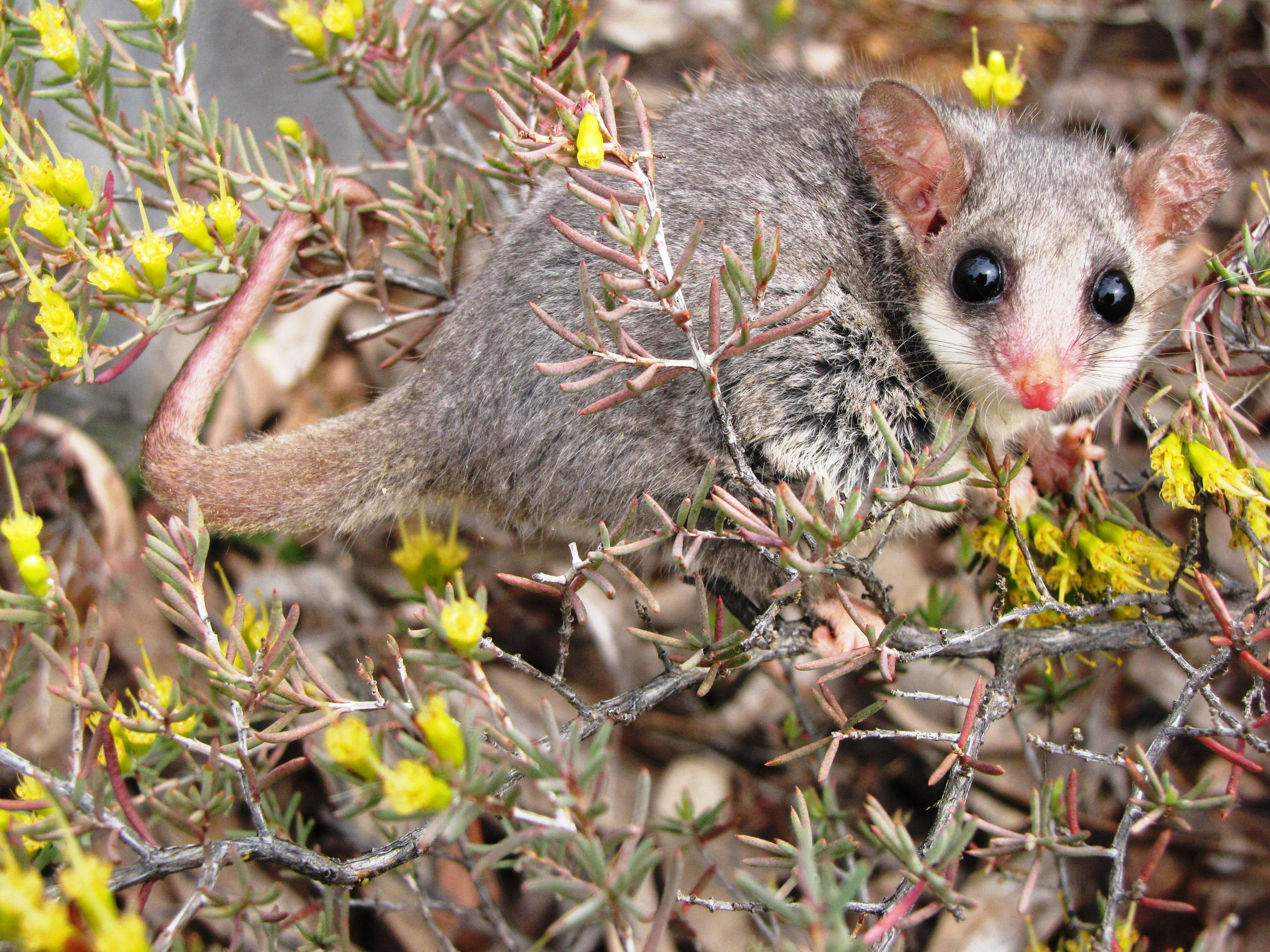
Eastern pygmy possum, Pilliga forest, NSW

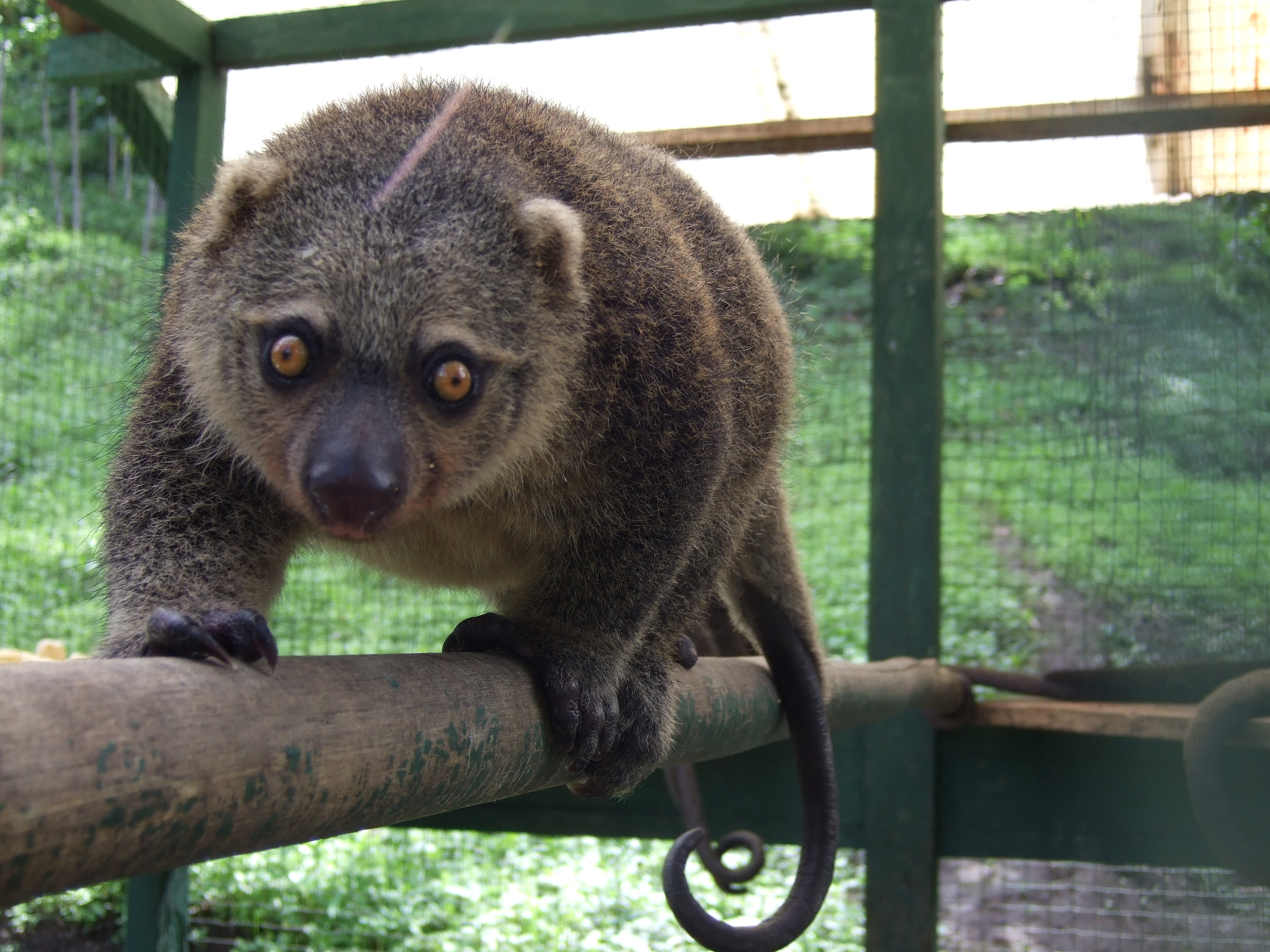
Sulawesi bear cuscus

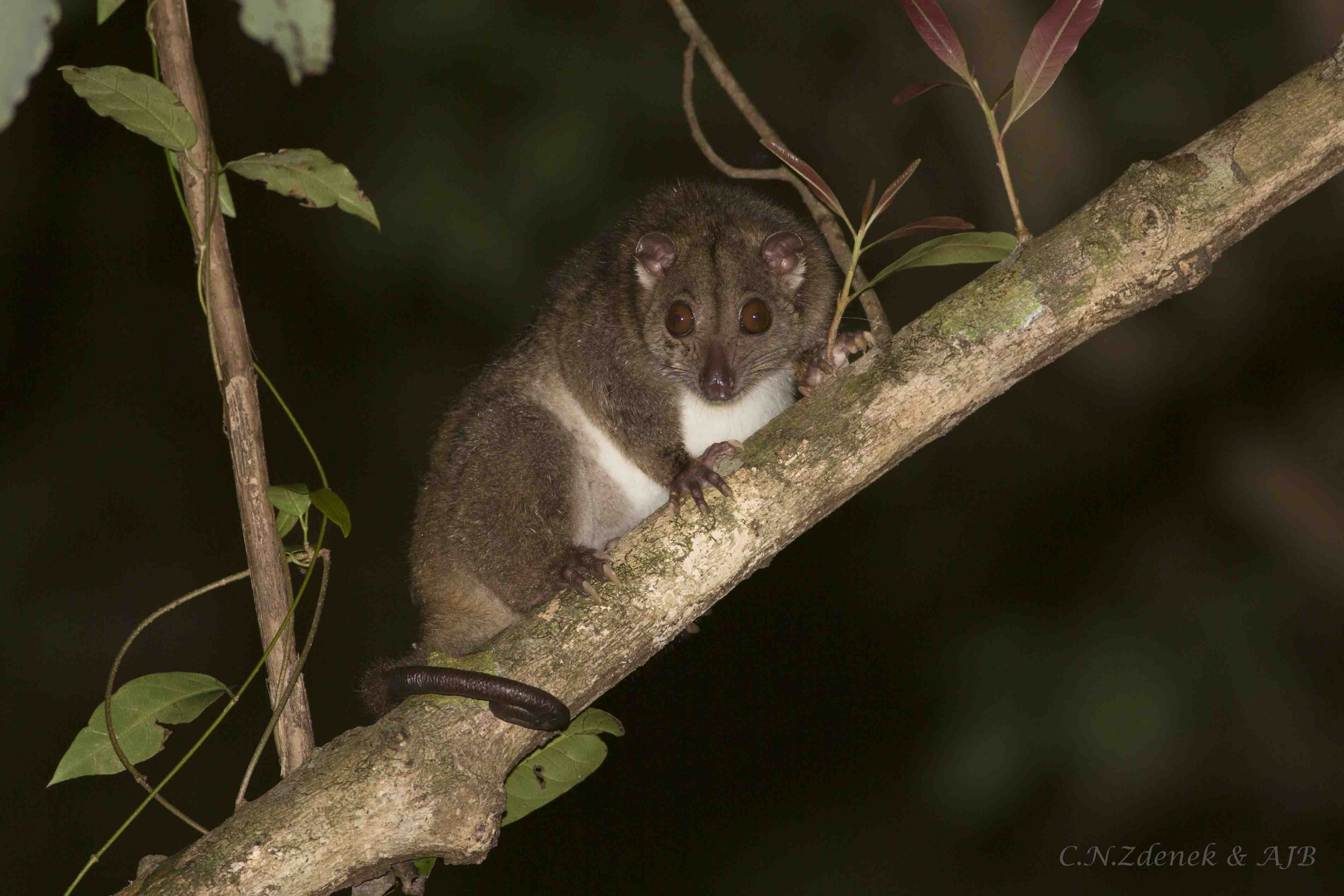
Southern common cuscus, Cape York Peninsula, Queensland

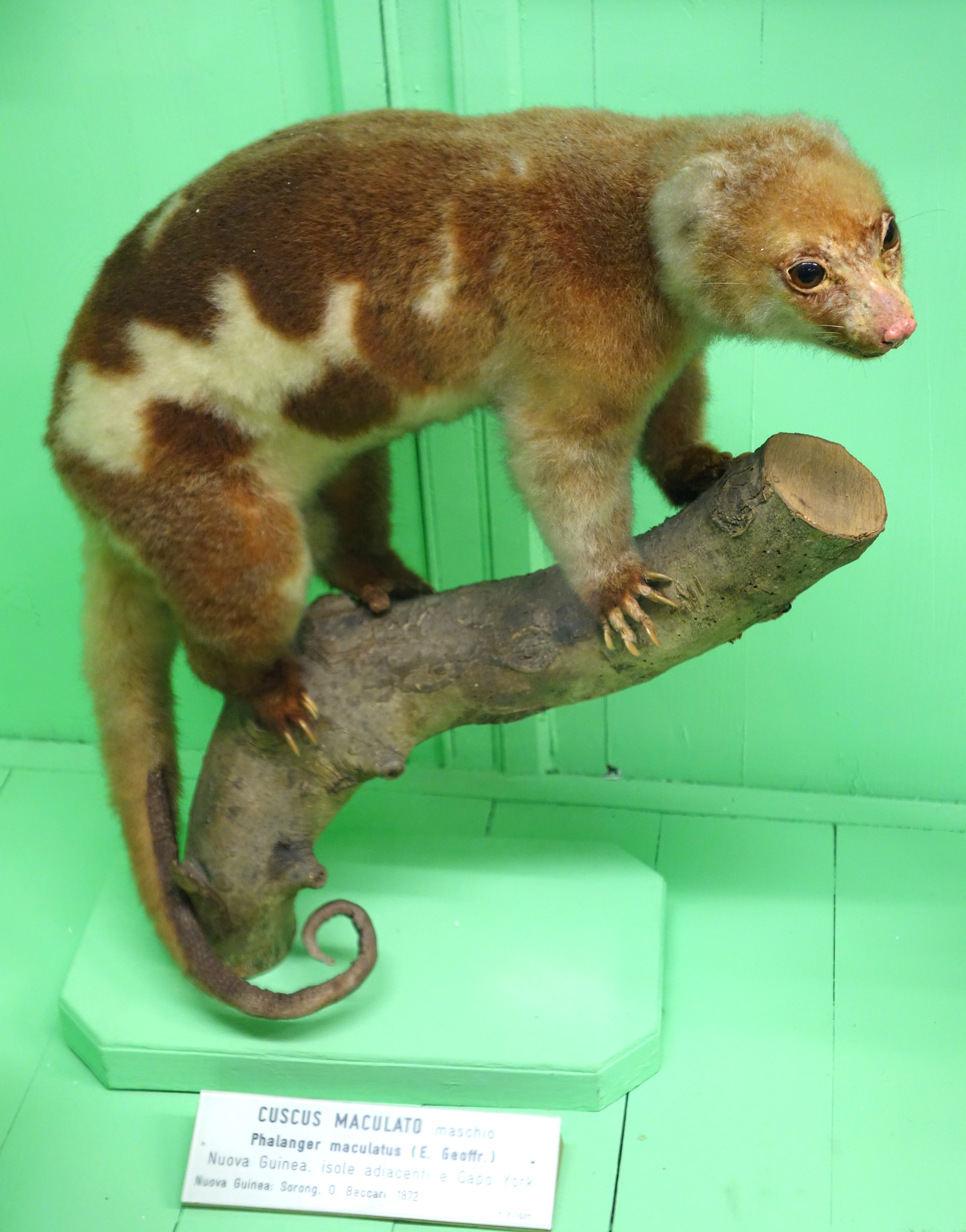
Common spotted cuscus, Genoa

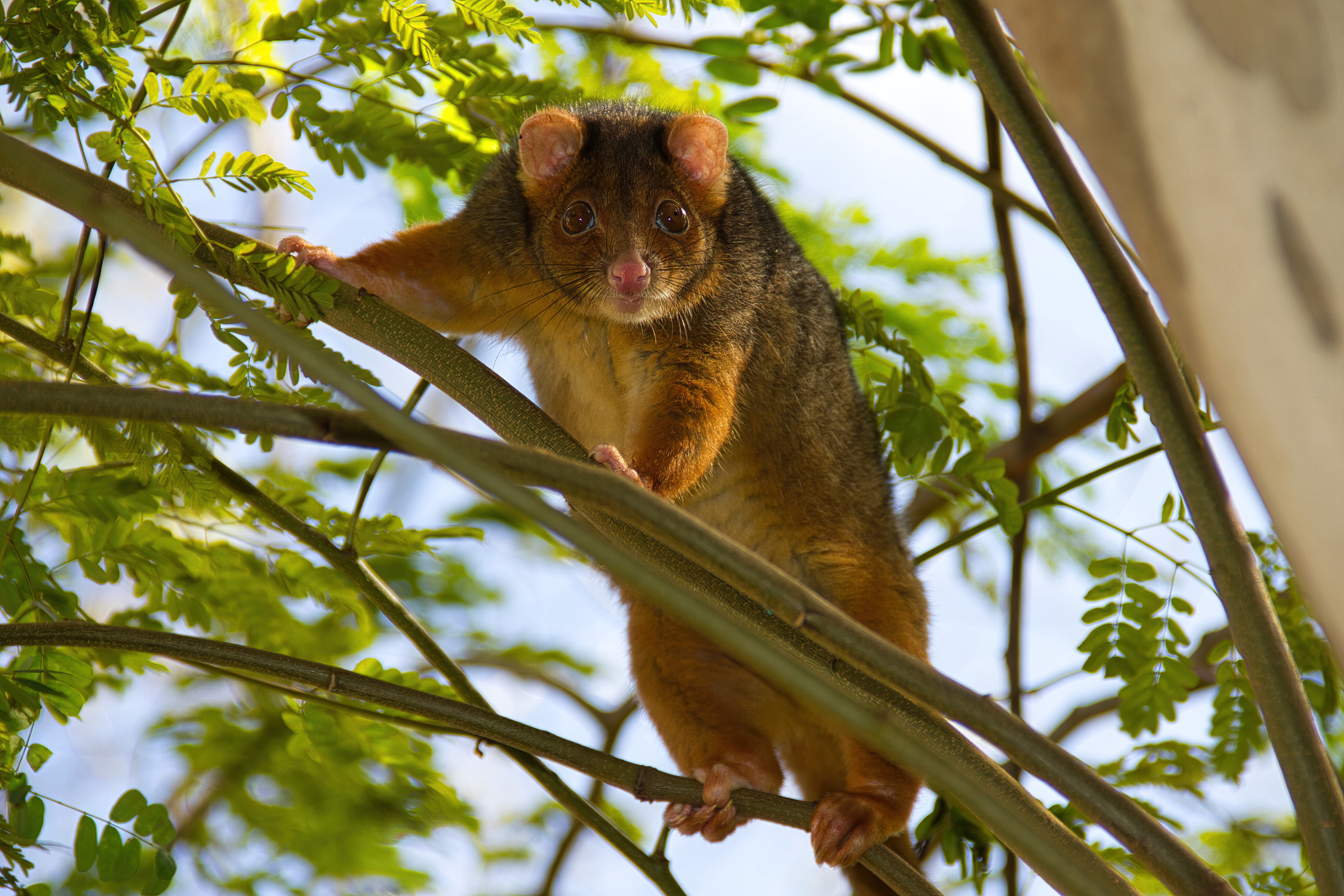
Common ringtail possum, Brisbane

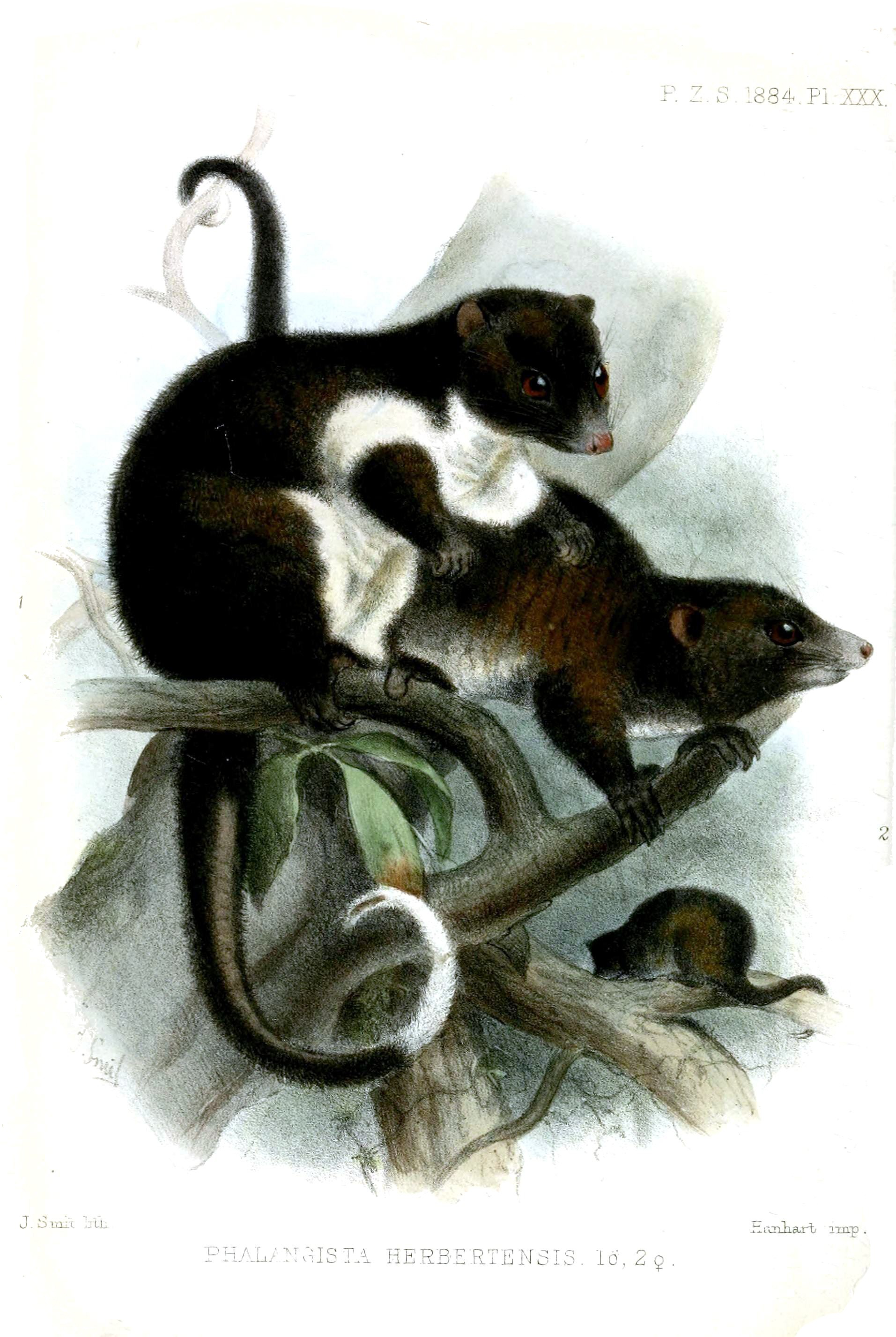
Herbert River ringtail possum, 1884

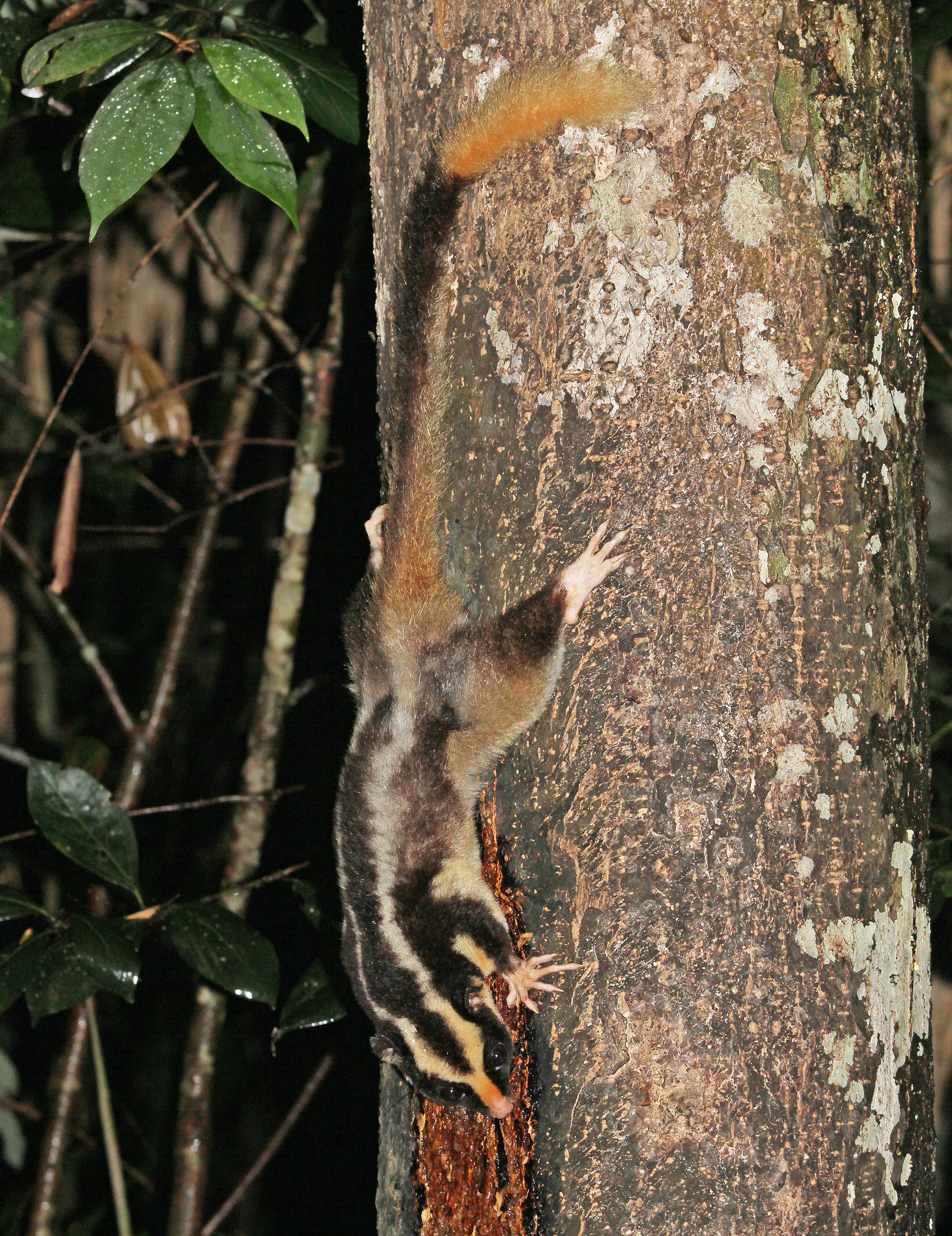
Striped possum, Crater Lakes National Park, Queensland

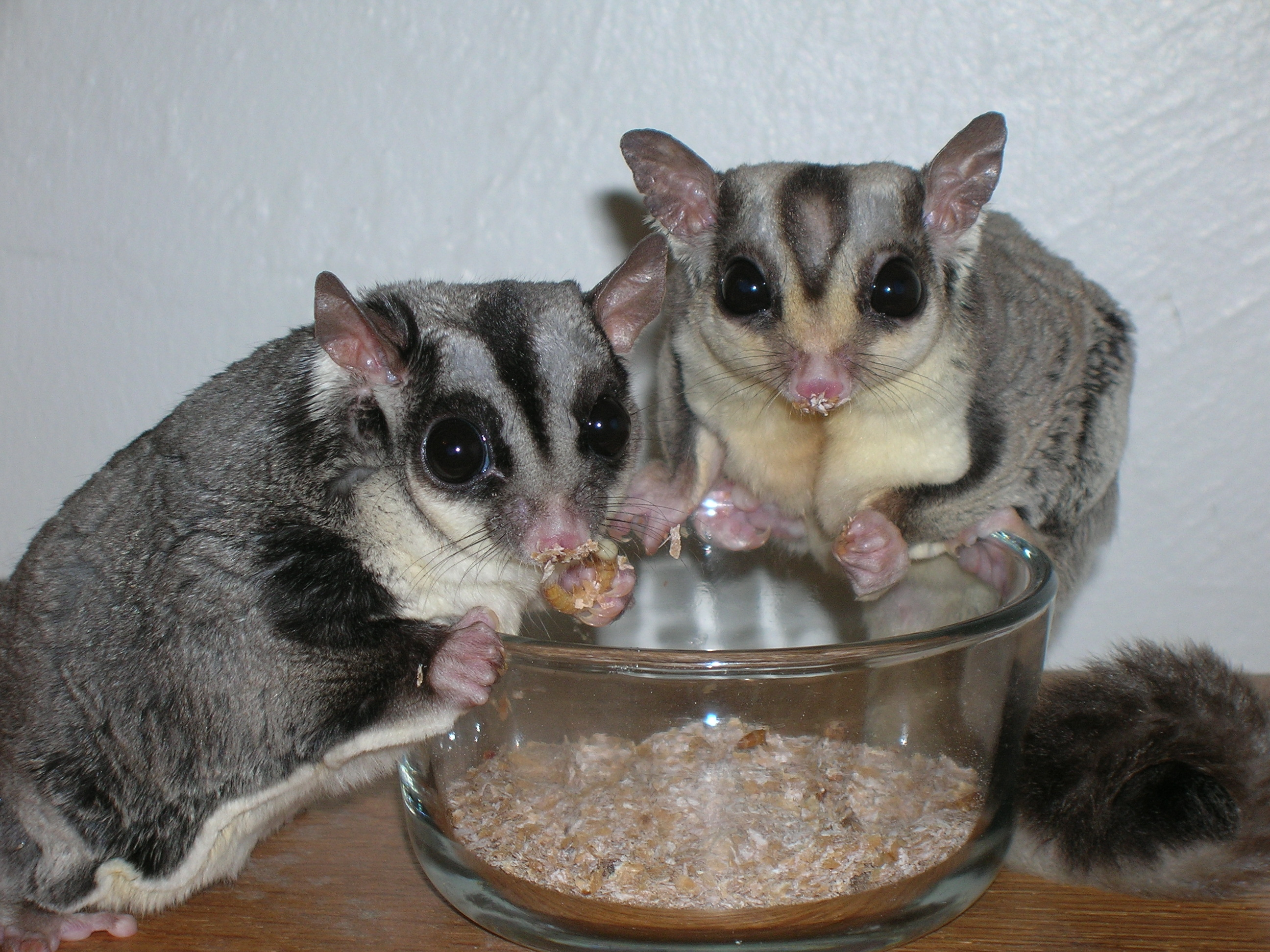
Sugar gliders at mealtime

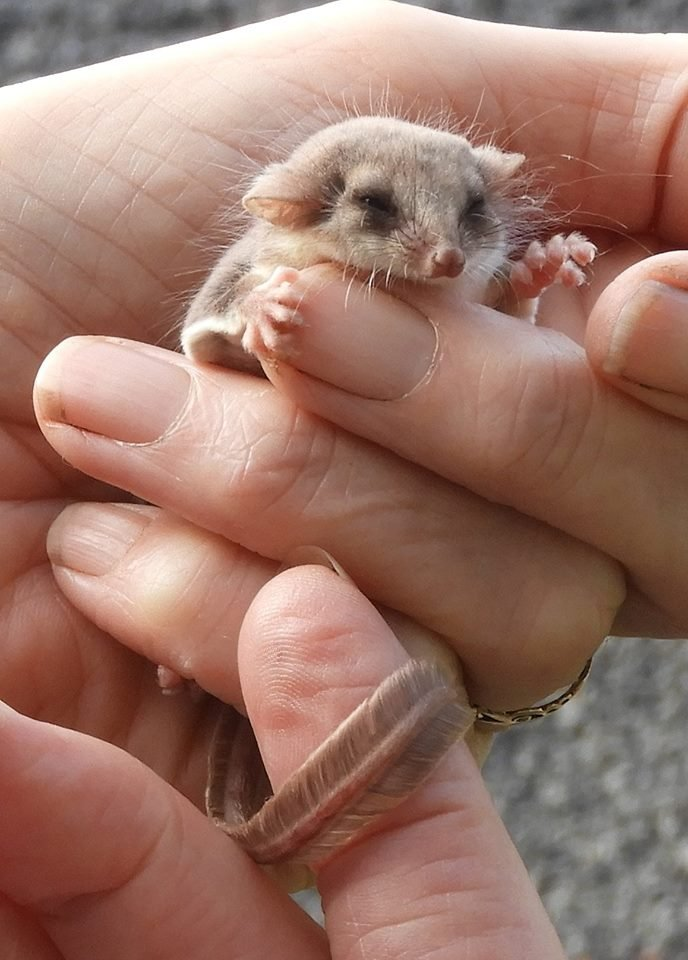
The diminutive feathertail glider

About two-thirds of Australian marsupials belong to the order Diprotodontia, which is split into three suborders, namely the Vombatiformes (wombats and the koala, four species in total); the large and diverse Phalangeriformes (the possums and gliders) and Macropodiformes (kangaroos, potoroos, wallabies and the musky rat-kangaroo).

Note: this classification is based on Ruedas & Morales 2005. However, Phalangeriformes has been recovered as paraphyletic with respect to Macropodiformes, rendering the latter a subset of the former if Phalangeriformes are to be considered a natural group.

Classification:

- Suborder Phalangeriformes: possums, gliders and allies
  - Superfamily Phalangeroidea
    - Family †Ektopodontidae:
      - Genus †Ektopodon
        - †Ektopodon serratus
        - †Ektopodon stirtoni
        - †Ektopodon ulta
    - Family Burramyidae: (pygmy possums)
      - Genus Burramys
        - Mountain pygmy possum, B. parvus
      - Genus Cercartetus
        - Long-tailed pygmy possum, C. caudatus
        - Southwestern pygmy possum, C. concinnus
        - Tasmanian pygmy possum, C. lepidus
        - Eastern pygmy possum, C. nanus
    - Family Phalangeridae: (brushtail possums and cuscuses)
      - Subfamily Ailuropinae
        - Genus Ailurops
          - Talaud bear cuscus, A. melanotis
          - Sulawesi bear cuscus, A. ursinus
        - Genus Strigocuscus
          - Sulawesi dwarf cuscus, S. celebensis
          - Banggai cuscus, S. pelegensis
      - Subfamily Phalangerinae
        - Tribe Phalangerini
          - Genus Phalanger
            - Gebe cuscus, P. alexandrae
            - Mountain cuscus, P. carmelitae
            - Ground cuscus, P. gymnotis
            - Eastern common cuscus, P. intercastellanus
            - Woodlark cuscus, P. lullulae
            - Blue-eyed cuscus, P. matabiru
            - Telefomin cuscus, P. matanim
            - Southern common cuscus, P. mimicus
            - Northern common cuscus, P. orientalis
            - Ornate cuscus, P. ornatus
            - Rothschild's cuscus, P. rothschildi
            - Silky cuscus, P. sericeus
            - Stein's cuscus, P. vestitus
          - Genus Spilocuscus
            - Admiralty Island cuscus, S. kraemeri
            - Common spotted cuscus, S. maculatus
            - Waigeou cuscus, S. papuensis
            - Black-spotted cuscus, S. rufoniger
            - Blue-eyed spotted cuscus, S. wilsoni
        - Tribe Trichosurini
          - Genus Trichosurus
            - Northern brushtail possum, T. arnhemensis
            - Short-eared possum, T. caninus
            - Mountain brushtail possum, T. cunninghami
            - Coppery brushtail possum, T. johnstonii
            - Common brushtail possum, T. vulpecula
          - Genus Wyulda
            - Scaly-tailed possum, W. squamicaudata
  - Superfamily Petauroidea
    - Family Pseudocheiridae: (ring-tailed possums and allies)
      - Subfamily Hemibelideinae
        - Genus Hemibelideus
          - Lemur-like ringtail possum, H. lemuroides
        - Genus Tous
          - Ring-tailed glider, T. ayamaruensis
        - Genus Petauroides
          - Central greater glider, P. armillatus
          - Northern greater glider, P. minor
          - Southern greater glider, P. volans
      - Subfamily Pseudocheirinae
        - Genus Petropseudes
          - Rock-haunting ringtail possum, P. dahli
        - Genus Pseudocheirus
          - Common ringtail possum, P. peregrinus
          - Western ringtail possum, P. occidentalis
        - Genus Pseudochirulus
          - Lowland ringtail possum, P. canescens
          - Weyland ringtail possum, P. caroli
          - Cinereus ringtail possum, P. cinereus
          - Painted ringtail possum, P. forbesi
          - Herbert River ringtail possum, P. herbertensis
          - Masked ringtail possum, P. larvatus
          - Pygmy ringtail possum, P. mayeri
          - Vogelkop ringtail possum, P. schlegeli
      - Subfamily Pseudochiropsinae
        - Genus Pseudochirops
          - D'Albertis' ringtail possum, P. albertisii
          - Green ringtail possum, P. archeri
          - Plush-coated ringtail possum, P. corinnae
          - Reclusive ringtail possum, P. coronatus
          - Coppery ringtail possum, P. cupreus
    - Family Petauridae: (striped possum, Leadbeater's possum, yellow-bellied glider, sugar glider, mahogany glider, squirrel glider)
      - Subfamily Dactylopsilinae
        - Genus Dactylopsila
          - Great-tailed triok, D. megalura
          - Long-fingered triok, D. palpator
          - Tate's triok, D. tatei
          - Striped possum, D. trivirgata
        - Genus Dactylonax
          - Pygmy long-fingered possum, D. kambuayai
      - Subfamily Petaurinae
        - Genus Gymnobelideus
          - Leadbeater's possum, G. leadbeateri
        - Genus Petaurus
          - Northern glider, P. abidi
          - Savanna glider, P. ariel
          - Yellow-bellied glider, P. australis
          - Biak glider, P. biacensis
          - Sugar glider, P. breviceps
          - Mahogany glider, P. gracilis
          - Squirrel glider, P. norfolcensis
          - Krefft's glider, P. notatus
    - Family Tarsipedidae: (honey possum)
      - Genus Tarsipes
        - Honey possum or noolbenger, T. rostratus
    - Family Acrobatidae: (feathertail glider and feather-tailed possum)
      - Genus Acrobates
        - Feathertail glider, A. pygmaeus
      - Genus Distoechurus
        - Feather-tailed possum, D. pennatus

The following cladogram is based on information from Álvarez-Carretero et al. 2022:

- - Phalangeriformes
    - Phalangeroidea
      - Burramyidae
        - Burramys
          - Burramys parvus (mountain pygmy possum)
        - Cercartetus
          - Cercartetus caudatus (long-tailed pygmy possum)
          - Cercartetus lepidus (Tasmanian pygmy possum)
          - Cercartetus concinnus (southwestern pygmy possum)
          - Cercartetus nanus (eastern pygmy possum)
      - Phalangeridae
        - Wyulda
          - Wyulda squamicaudata (scaly-tailed possum)
        - Trichosurus
          - Trichosurus johnstonii (coppery brushtail possum)
          - Trichosurus caninus (short-eared possum)
          - Trichosurus arnhemensis (northern brushtail possum)
          - Trichosurus vulpecula (common brushtail possum)
        - Strigocuscus/Ailurops
          - Strigicuscus celebensis (Sulawesi dwarf cuscus)
          - Ailurops ursinus (Sulawesi bear cuscus)
          - Strigocuscus pelengensis (Banggai cuscus)
        - Spilocuscus
          - Spilocuscus rufoniger (black-spotted cuscus)
          - Spilocuscus maculatus (common spotted cuscus)
        - Phalanger
          - Phalanger gymnotis(ground cuscus)
          - Phalanger vestitus (Stein's cuscus)
          - Phalanger lullulae (woodlark cuscus)
          - Phalanger sericeus (silky cuscus)
          - Phalanger orientalis (northern common cuscus)
          - Phalanger carmelitae (mountain cuscus)
    - Petauroidea
      - Acrobatidae
        - Distoechurus
          - Distoechurus pennatus (feather-tailed possum)
        - Acrobates
          - Acrobates pygmaeus (feathertail glider)
      - Tarsipedidae
        - Tarsipes
          - Tarsipes rostratus (honey possum)
      - Petauridae
        - Dactylopsila
          - Dactylopsila trivirgata (striped possum)
          - Dactylopsila palpator (long-fingered triok)
        - Gymnobelideus
          - Gymnobelideus leadbeateri (Leadbeater's possum)
        - Petaurus
          - Petarus abidi (northern glider)
          - Petaurus breviceps (sugar glider)
          - Petaurus norfolcensis (squirrel glider)
      - Pseudocheiridae
        - Pseudocheirus
          - Pseudocheirus peregrinus (common ringtail possum)
        - Pseudochirulus
          - Pseudochirulus herbertensis (Herbert River ringtail possum)
          - Pseudochirulus forbesi (painted ringtail possum)
          - Pseudochirulus canescens (lowland ringtail possum)
          - Pseudochirulus caroli (Weyland ringtail possum)
          - Pseudochirulus mayeri (pygmy ringtail possum)
        - Hemibelideus
          - Hemibelideus lemuroides (lemur-like ringtail possum)
        - Petauroides
          - Petauroides volans (southern greater glider)
        - Pseudochirops/Petropseudes
          - Pseudochirops archeri (green ringtail possum)
          - Petropseudes dahli (rock-haunting ringtail possum)
          - Pseudochirops corinnae (plush-coated ringtail possum)
          - Pseudochirops albertisii (D'Albertis' ringtail possum)
          - Pseudochirops cupreus (coppery ringtail possum)

== See also ==
- Fauna of Australia
