= Ringtail (disambiguation) =

Ringtail, ring tail, or ring-tail may refer to:

== Animals ==
=== Mammals ===
- Ring-tailed cat, Bassariscus astutus, a mammal of the raccoon family, in North America
- South American coati, Nasua nasua, also called the ring-tailed coati
- Ring-tailed ground squirrel, Spermophilus annulatus, of North America
- Ring-tailed lemur, Lemur catta, of Madagascar
- Ring-tailed mongoose, Galidia elegans, of Madagascar
- Ringtail possums, the family Pseudocheiridae, of Australia and New Guinea:
  - Cinereus ringtail possum, Pseudochirulus cinereus
  - Common ringtail possum, Pseudocheirus peregrinus
  - Western ringtail possum, Pseudocheirus peregrinus occidentalis
  - Coppery ringtail possum Pseudochirops cupreus
  - D'Albertis' ringtail possum, Pseudochirops albertisii
  - Green ringtail possum, Pseudochirops archeri
  - Herbert River ringtail possum, Pseudochirulus herbertensis
  - Lemur-like ringtail possum, Hemibelideus lemuroides
  - Lowland ringtail possum, Pseudochirulus canescens
  - Painted ringtail possum, Pseudochirulus forbesi
  - Plush-coated ringtail possum, Pseudochirops corinnae
  - Pygmy ringtail possum, Pseudochirulus mayeri
  - Reclusive ringtail possum, Pseudochirops coronatus
  - Rock-haunting ringtail possum, Petropseudes dahli
  - Vogelkop ringtail possum, Pseudochirulus schlegeli
  - Weyland ringtail possum, Pseudochirulus caroli

=== Other ===
- Ring-tailed pigeon Patagioenas caribaea, a bird
- Ring-tails (harrier), an informal term for the juveniles and females of several species of harrier
- Erpetogomphus, a genus of dragonflies known as "ringtails"

== Other uses ==
- Ringtail (disease), a rodent disease

== See also ==
- Ringtail (sail), an extra sail, usually set in light winds, extending abaft the leech of a fore and aft sail
- HMS Ringtail or RNAS Burscough, a former navy airfield in Lancashire, England
- Ubuntu 13.04 Raring Ringtail, a version of Ubuntu named after the ringtail raccoon
- Ring-tailed cardinalfish, Apogon aureus, a fish
- Blue ringtail, Austrolestes annulosus, Australian damselfly
- Metallic ringtail, Austrolestes cingulatus, Australian damselfly
- Capuchin monkey, New World monkeys of the subfamily Cebinae
- Cacomistle, Bassariscus sumichrasti, a member of the carnivoran family Procyonidae
