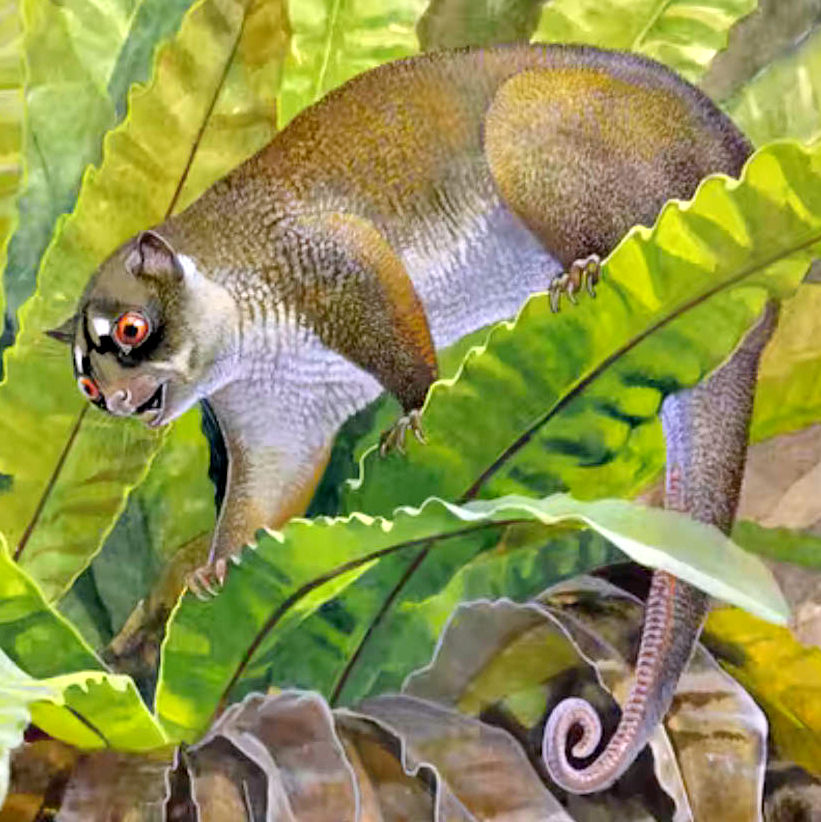
- Life reconstruction of Ektopodon serratus

Scientific classification
- Kingdom: Animalia
- Phylum: Chordata
- Class: Mammalia
- Infraclass: Marsupialia
- Order: Diprotodontia
- Suborder: Phalangeriformes
- Superfamily: Phalangeroidea
- Family: †Ektopodontidae; Stirton, Tedford & Woodburne 1967
- Genus: †Ektopodon; Stirton, Tedford & Woodburne, 1967.

Type species
- †Ektopodon serratus Stirton, Tedford & Woodburne 1967

Other species
- †E. litolophus Pledge, 1999; †E. paucicristata Rich et al., 2006; †E. stirtoni Pledge, 1986; †E. tommosi Pledge, 2016; †E. ulta Megirian et al., 2004

= Ektopodon =

Ektopodon Temporal range: Late Oligocene–Early Pleistocene

Extinct genus of marsupials

Ektopodon is an extinct genus of marsupial, and is the type genus of the family Ektopodontidae which occurred in forested environments in South Australia, Queensland and Victoria. The last species of this group went extinct in the early Pleistocene (between 2.588 million years ago and 781,000 years ago). Its body mass was estimated around 1300 grams. Scientists believe that ektopodontids were highly specialised seed-eating possums.

The type species Ektopodon serratus describes material excavated at the Lake Ngapakaldi fossil site in South Australia.

== Taxonomy ==
The genus Ektopodon, now extinct, was a group of marsupials that once inhabited the forests of South Australia, Queensland, and Victoria. Classified under the family Ektopodontidae, these marsupials were last known to exist during the early Pleistocene epoch, approximately 2.588 million to 781,000 years ago. Initial descriptions from the 1960s and 1980s highlighted their unique molar characteristics. Recent studies have introduced two new species of ektopodontid marsupials from the lower deposits of the Etadunna Formation (latest Oligocene) in South Australia, along with a new phylogenetic hypothesis for the Ektopodontidae family.

== Description ==
Ektopodon is distinguished by its unique cranial morphology, including a shortened rostrum and specific flexures between the premolars and molars. The molar morphologies of the late Oligocene genera, Chunia and Ektopodon, are distinct, but species determination remains challenging. The facial angulation, defined by the flexure of the rostrum at the boundary between P3 and the molar row, results in the rostrum being angled differently from the molar row. Ektopodontids exhibit significantly greater angulation and shorter faces compared to contemporary phalangeriform possums. This degree of facial shortening is associated with species-level differences in dental morphology.

== Molar and Fossil Findings ==
The Lake Eyre Basin in South Australia contains some of Australia's oldest known fossil marsupials, found in the Etadunna Formation, which dates back 23.3 to 25 million years ago. During this time, terrestrial herbivorous marsupials underwent significant taxonomic and dental changes, likely due to the warming climate of Australia. Ektopodon, a genus within the Ektopodontidae family, has unique molar structures. The molars of the Late Oligocene Ektopodon stirtoni feature a distinctive lophodont morphology with transverse lophs modified into laterally compressed cusps. This unique dental structure is not found in any other marsupials or placental mammals. The enamel of Ektopodon molars is primarily radial with specific modifications, and the distribution of various enamel types is distinctive among marsupial families. The fossil record of Ektopodontidae spans from the upper Oligocene to the Pliocene, with molars that exhibit unique adaptations. The first three upper and lower molars have two or three modified transverse lophs, while the fourth molars have reduced lophs. The number of cusps per loph varies, with 8 to 10 cusps depending on the tooth position.

== Distribution and habitat ==
The fossil record of Ektopodon predominantly originates from the Etadunna Formation in South Australia, dated to the late Oligocene and early Miocene epochs. . This formation comprises lacustrine sediments rich in claystones and mudstones, interspersed with dolomitic layers that serve as key stratigraphic markers. Significant fossil discoveries from faunal zones such as the Minkina and Ditjimanka Local Faunas have illuminated the diversity and distribution of ektopodontids during their prime.

== Behaviour and Ecology ==
Ektopodon and its relatives exhibited unique dental morphologies, particularly in the arrangement and structure of their molars. Variations in molar shape and size among species like Chunia and Ektopodon are critical for species identification and phylogenetic analysis. These dental adaptations reflect their seed-eating behaviours, which required robust and efficient grinding surfaces.
