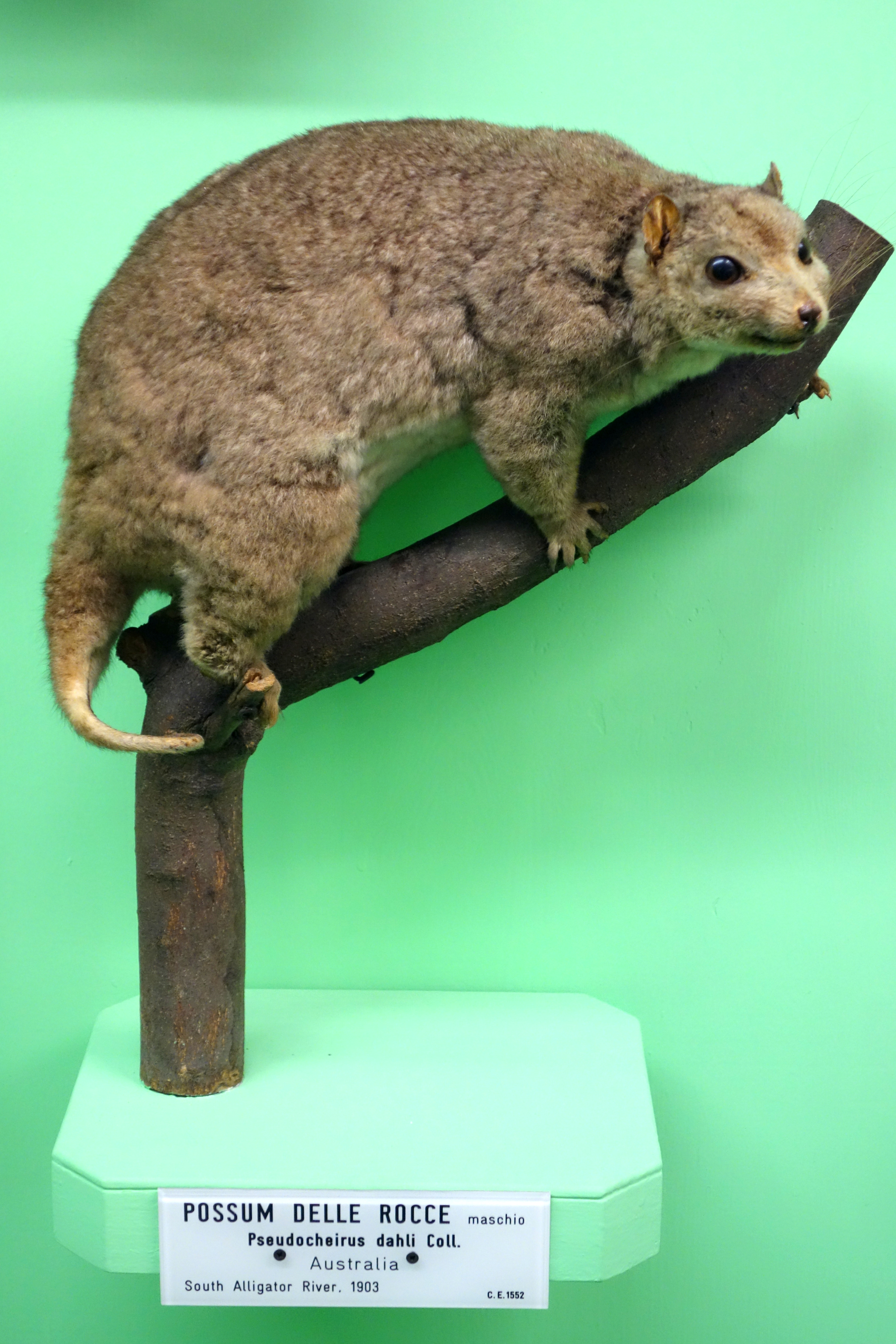

Conservation status
- Least Concern (IUCN 3.1)

Scientific classification
- Kingdom: Animalia
- Phylum: Chordata
- Class: Mammalia
- Infraclass: Marsupialia
- Order: Diprotodontia
- Family: Pseudocheiridae
- Subfamily: Pseudocheirinae
- Genus: Petropseudes; Thomas, 1923
- Species: P. dahli

Binomial name
- Petropseudes dahli (Collett, 1895)
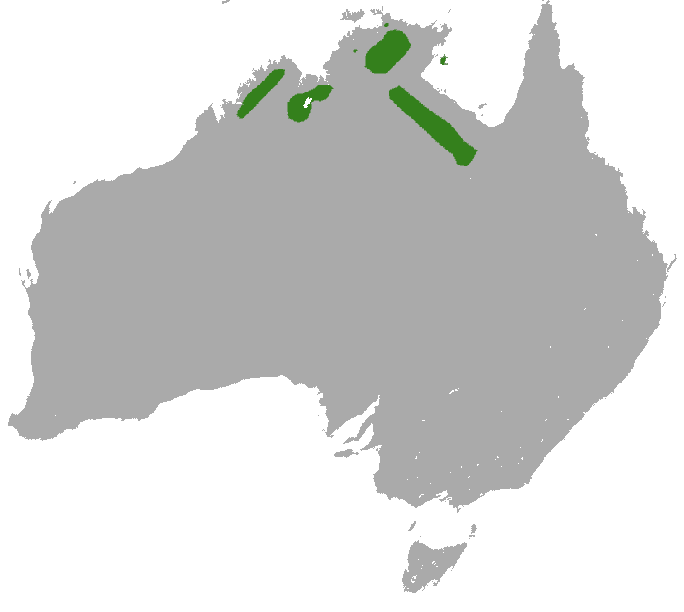
- Rock-haunting ringtail possum range

= Rock-haunting ringtail possum =

Species of marsupial

The rock-haunting ringtail possum (Petropseudes dahli), also known as the rock ringtail possum, is a species of Australian possum. It is found in rocky escarpments in the Kimberley, Arnhem Land and Gulf of Carpentaria across Western Australia and Northern Territory and just passing the Queensland border. It is also found on Groote Eylandt. According to some authorities, it is the only species in the genus Petropseudes, but other authorities place it among the members of the genus Pseudochirops.

The rock-haunting ringtail possum has one of the shortest tails of all ringtail possums, and at its end it is hairless and scaly. It lives in small groups and is mainly herbivorous. It has a stocky build and is mostly grey in colour.

== Description ==
The rock-haunting ringtail possum is almost the size of a small rabbit. It is grey to reddish-grey in colour on the back, while its underside is a light cream colour. It has white hair patches underneath its small, round ears and both above and below the eyes. A mid-dorsal stripe runs from the crown of the head to the middle of the back. Like other possums, it has a prehensile tail, adapted for grasping especially by wrapping around. However, the tail is unique in its appearance compared to that of other possums as it is covered with fur only halfway down. Males are 33.4 to 37.5 cm long while females are generally bigger and range from 34.9 to 38.3 cm in length and weigh between 1,280 and 2,000 grams. Another uncommon feature in the appearance of this species is that it has vertical pupils.

== Ecology ==
The rock-haunting ringtail possum disperses seeds through its fruit eating habits. It also influences termite populations and acts as prey for regional predators.

The rock-haunting ringtail possum has been affected by human induced habitat fragmentation and hence, its numbers have decreased significantly. The species is listed as a priority species in Western Australia.

=== Habitat ===
The rock-haunting ringtail possum lives exclusively in rocky outcrops and prefers areas with large boulders and deeply fissured rock. It uses the crevices to hide by just sticking its head into the crevice with the body exposed. It is strictly nocturnal; it only moves out of its sheltered rock crevices to climbing trees to feed at night. It does not make a nest and has been observed occasionally to be sleeping in well protected rock ledges during the day. This suggests a high level of adaptation to a terrestrial existence. Indicators of a reduction in arboreal adaptation are shorter legs, shorter claws, shorter tail and a slightly longer snout.

=== Diet ===
The rock-haunting ringtail possum eats fruits, flowers and leaves of a variety of trees found near its habitat and occasionally feeds on termites. It usually stays close to the rocks while feeding but has been found as far as 100m from the nearest outcrop. Most common of the blossoms it eats are of Darwin Woollybutt (Eucalyptus miniata) and Darwin Stringybark (Eucalyptus tetrodonta). Its major fruit intake is from Zyziphus oenoplia, Vitex glabrata, Billy Goat Plum (Terminalia ferdinandiana), and Owenia vernicosa. Leaves eaten include Flagelleria indica, Sersalisia sericea, and vine reedcane.

=== Known predators ===
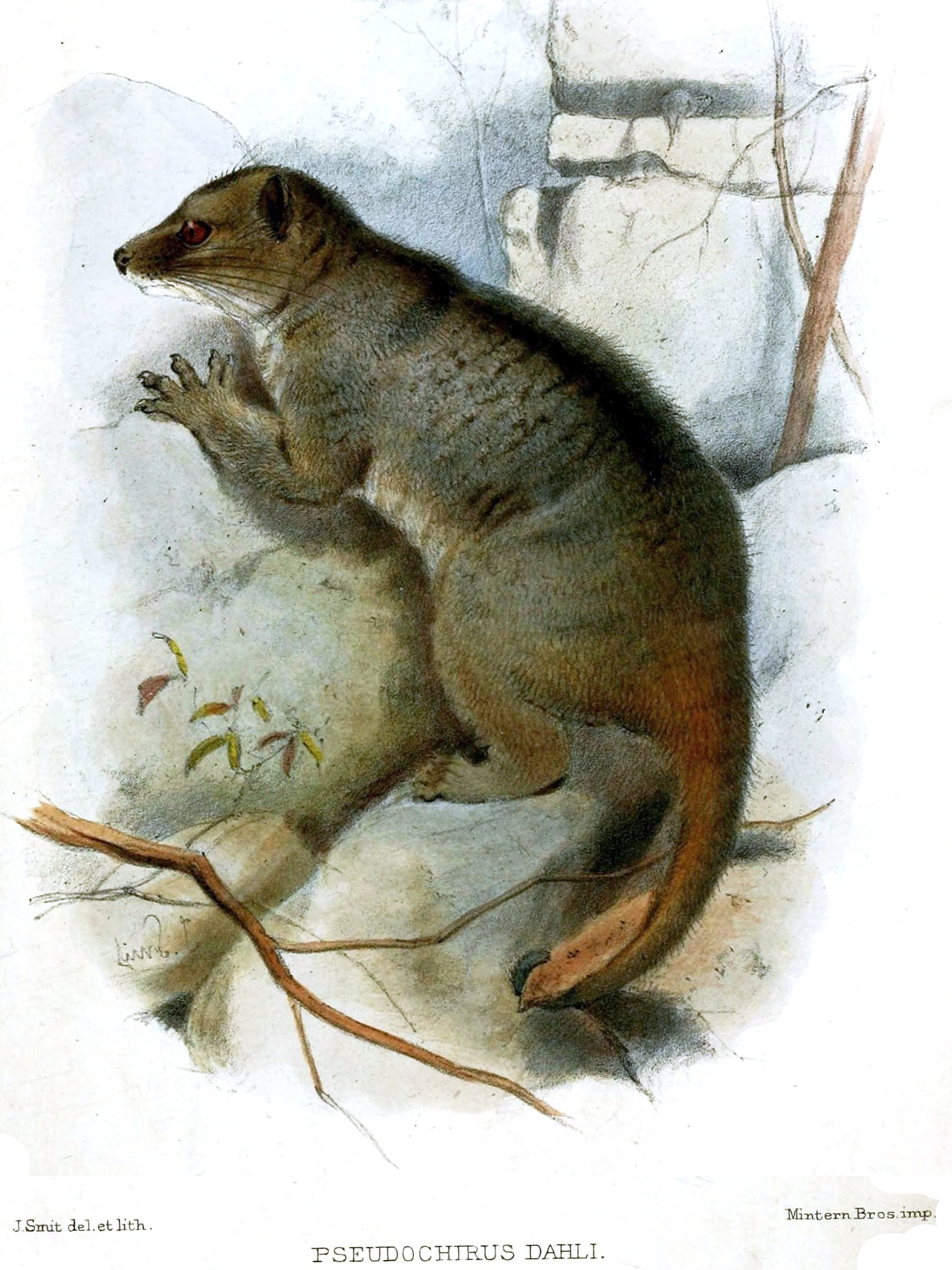

Some known predators of the rock-haunting ringtail possum are the Dingo (Canis lupus dingo), the Oenpelli Python (Morelia oenpelliensis), the Olive Python (Liasis olivaceous), quolls (Dasyurus spp.), owls (Strigiformes), feral cats (Felis catus), red foxes (Vulpes vulpes), domestic dogs (Canis lupus familiaris) and humans (Homo sapiens). The rock-haunting ringtail possum spends a large amount of time participating in sentinel behavior to avoid predators. It perches on branches or ledges and scans the area for danger. In an attempt to deter predators and to warn others, this possum beats its tail against tree branches vigorously causing the entire tree to shake.

== Lifestyle ==
Of all the Australian possums, the rock-haunting ringtail possum lives in the most tightly knit family groups. Adults and their young will stay within 2–3 metres of each other throughout the night. The family groups are generally made up of about 4 individuals, although group sizes of 2 to 10 individuals have been reported. The possum spends most of its time sheltered within rock piles or crevices. After dark it moves from its rocky home into the nearby trees where it feeds. This possum is secretive, difficult to trap and avoids contact and confrontation as far as possible. It is primarily terrestrial, moving into the trees only to feed. This distinguishes it from its close, mostly arboreal relatives. Its eye-shine is very bright in a spotlight but unlike most possums, it does not freeze when caught in a beam of light. Instead, it retreats to its rock shelter or crevices where it hides with its head in the crevice but its body exposed.

=== Reproduction ===
There appears to be no particular season for breeding. However, females with a large young in the pouch and a young on the back have been seen in March, July, August and September. Although the gestation period information is not available for the species, it is known that close relatives have gestation periods from 16 to 30 days. The new offspring spends its first five weeks in the female's large pouch which has two teats. The parents usually carry the new offspring on their back after they have left the mother's pouch. Caring for the young is divided nearly equally among the parents. The parents are assisted in raising the offspring by the previous offspring who commonly stay with the family unit. The parents practice protective behaviours such as spend time watching for predators, tail beating, and vocalizing and marshaling the young to keep them relatively close.

=== Home range and obligate monogamy ===
Both sexes have about the same home range size. Average home range is 0.9 hectares, with home ranges ranging in size from 0.5 to 1.2 hectares. The average density in these home ranges is 0.4 possums per hectare. Females live with one male in their home range, which are commonly marked by scent posts. To scent-mark, the rock-haunting ringtail possum rubs or presses their cloacal-caudal region or chest against the surface. While the possum also marked rock ledges and trees within its home ranges, scent marking was most vigorous around den sites.

The rock-haunting ringtail possum is one of few obligate monogamous marsupial species. A consistent characteristic of obligate monogamy displayed by this species is the existence of cohesive and persistent pair bonds with mutual or asymmetrical attraction between adults. Both sexes of this species maintain strong pair bonds, as shown by the wide array of maintenance behaviours, which is a measure of bond 'strength'. However, males maintained the pair bond at a higher rate than females. Both sexes shared the decision-making process in terms of changing group activity.

Presence of long-lasting bonds between parents and young seen in the family of this species is another attribute of obligate monogamy. Both sexes of the rock-haunting ringtail possum showed substantial long-term care of offspring. An unusual interaction observed between parents and young were the embrace by adult males and the bridge formation. Both sexes embrace young, whereas only females engage in bridge formation. The mother allows her young to move from branch to branch by using her body as a bridge. This has never been seen in another possum. Embracing is a way for the adults to know the stage of maturation of the offspring. A third feature of obligate monogamy shown by the Rock-haunting Ringtail Possum is the rearing of younger siblings by juveniles.

=== Communication ===
The rock-haunting ringtail possum mostly uses scent to communicate. Adult possums have a distinct gland on the chest and males have a paracloacal gland which is about 2 cm in diameter. The possum maintains scent posts that are visited commonly. The rock-haunting ringtail possum uses both urine and faeces to mark these areas. This possum is also thought to mark tree branches using its paracloacal gland. The rock-haunting ringtail possum has been observed striking its tail against rocks, possibly as a form of communication. The species also is able to make quiet screeches and grunts that serve as auditory communication.

== In Aboriginal language and culture ==
The Kunwinjku of Western Arnhem Land hunted ngingma, as they call this possum by placing sugar bag (bush honey) on a rock. Attracted to the bait the animal was then speared. Another name for this species in Bininj Kunwok is djorrkkun. Knut Dahl, who caught the specimen from which the specimen from which the species was described, called it a wogoit, the name the local tribe used for the animal.
