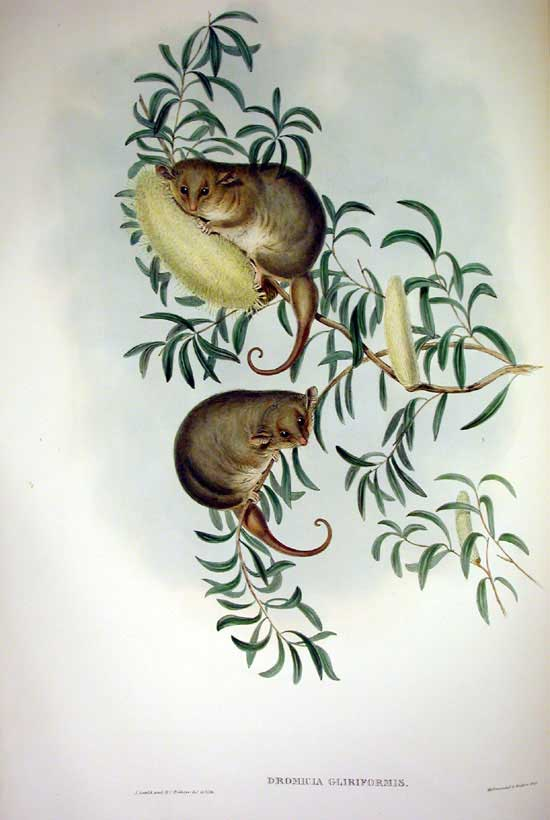
- Eastern pygmy possum

Scientific classification
- Domain: Eukaryota
- Kingdom: Animalia
- Phylum: Chordata
- Class: Mammalia
- Infraclass: Marsupialia
- Order: Diprotodontia
- Suborder: Phalangeriformes
- Superfamily: Phalangeroidea; Thomas, 1888

Families
- Burramyidae; Phalangeridae; †Ektopodontidae; †Miralinidae

= Phalangeroidea =

Superfamily of marsupials

The Phalangeroidea are a superfamily of mammals that include the families Burramyidae and Phalangeridae, as well as the extinct families Ektopodontidae and Miralinidae. They are mainly representatives of the possum marsupials.
