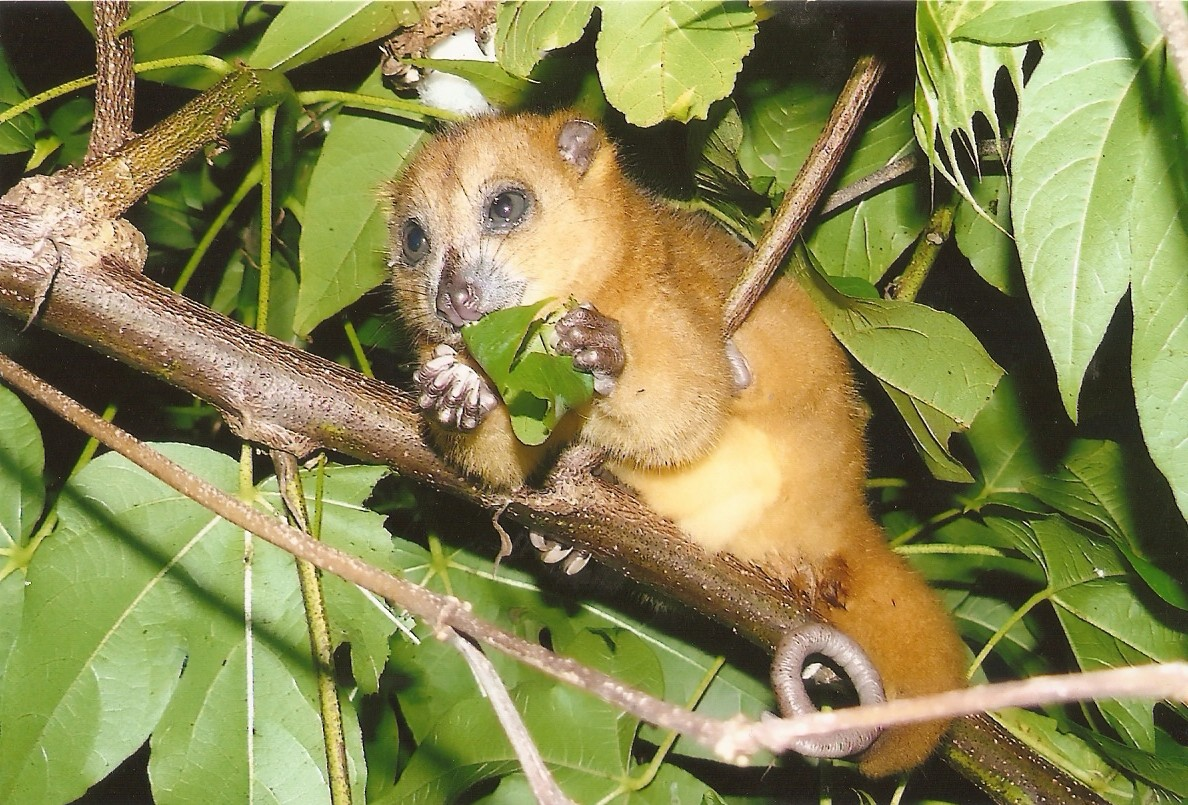
- A banggai cuscus on a tree

Conservation status
- Least Concern (IUCN 3.1)

Scientific classification
- Kingdom: Animalia
- Phylum: Chordata
- Class: Mammalia
- Infraclass: Marsupialia
- Order: Diprotodontia
- Family: Phalangeridae
- Genus: Strigocuscus
- Species: S. pelengensis

Binomial name
- Strigocuscus pelengensis (Tate, 1945)
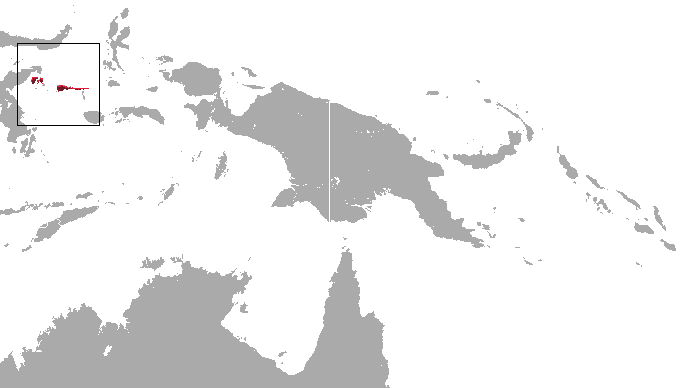
- Banggai cuscus range

= Banggai cuscus =

Species of marsupial

The Banggai cuscus (Strigocuscus pelengensis) is a species of cuscus, a type of possum. Also known as the Peleng cuscus, Menden's cuscus or Peleng phalanger, it is found in the Peleng and Sula Islands to the east of Sulawesi in Indonesia.
