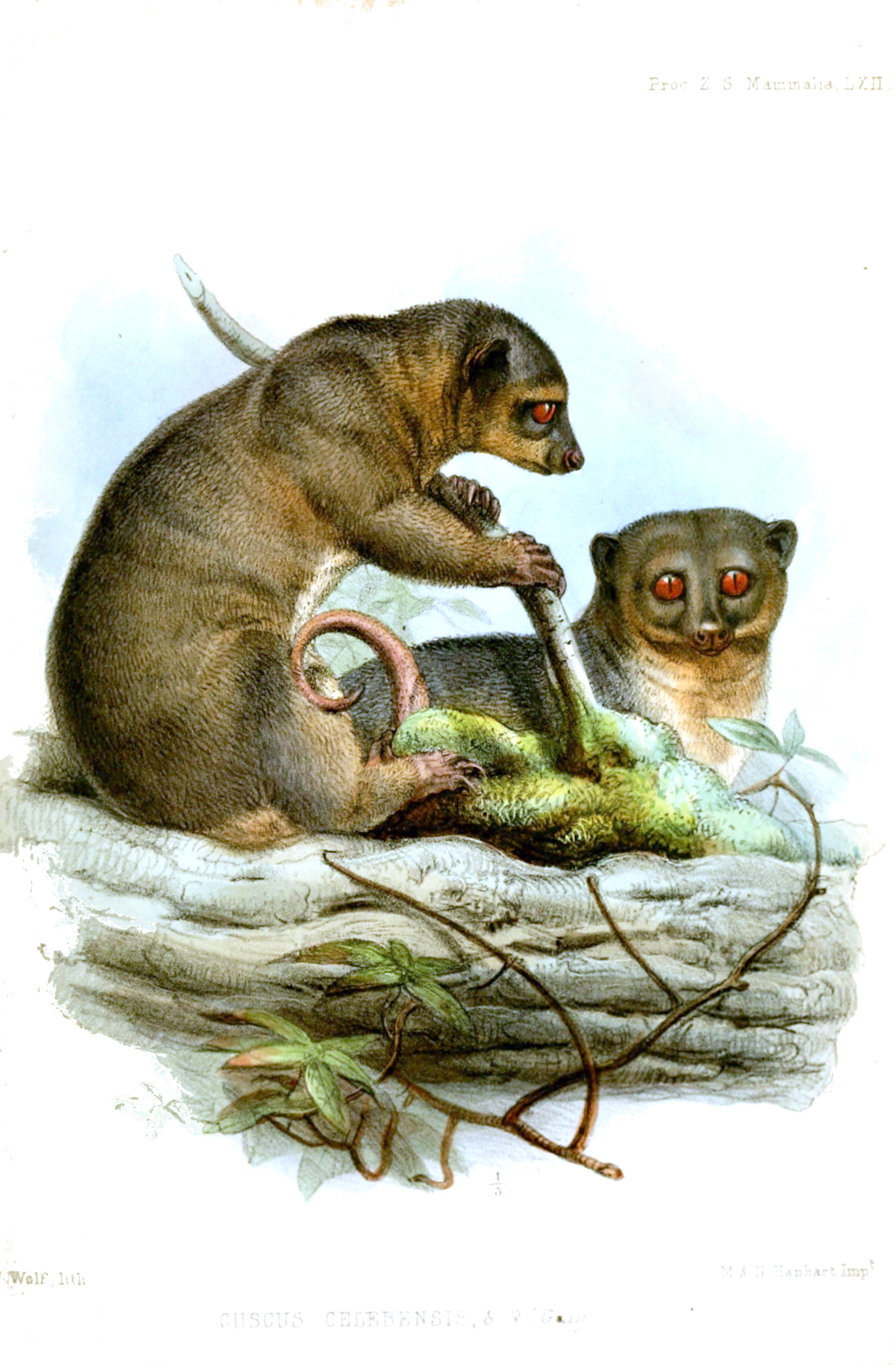
- Strigocuscus celebensis

Scientific classification
- Kingdom: Animalia
- Phylum: Chordata
- Class: Mammalia
- Infraclass: Marsupialia
- Order: Diprotodontia
- Family: Phalangeridae
- Subfamily: Ailuropinae
- Genus: Strigocuscus; J. E. Gray, 1861

Type species
- Cuscus celebensis J. E. Gray, 1858

Species
- S. celebensis; S. pelengensis

= Strigocuscus =

Genus of marsupial mammals

Dwarf cuscus (Strigocuscus) is a nocturnal, arboreal marsupial genus in the family Phalangeridae found only in Sulawesi (the largest island in Wallacea) and some of its surrounding small offshore islands. Due to the unique biogeography of Sulawesi giving sub-regions of endemism, it is likely that there are several different species or subspecies as yet to be described by science. So far, the genus contains the following species:

- Sulawesi dwarf cuscus (Strigocuscus celebensis)
- Banggai cuscus (Strigocuscus pelengensis)
