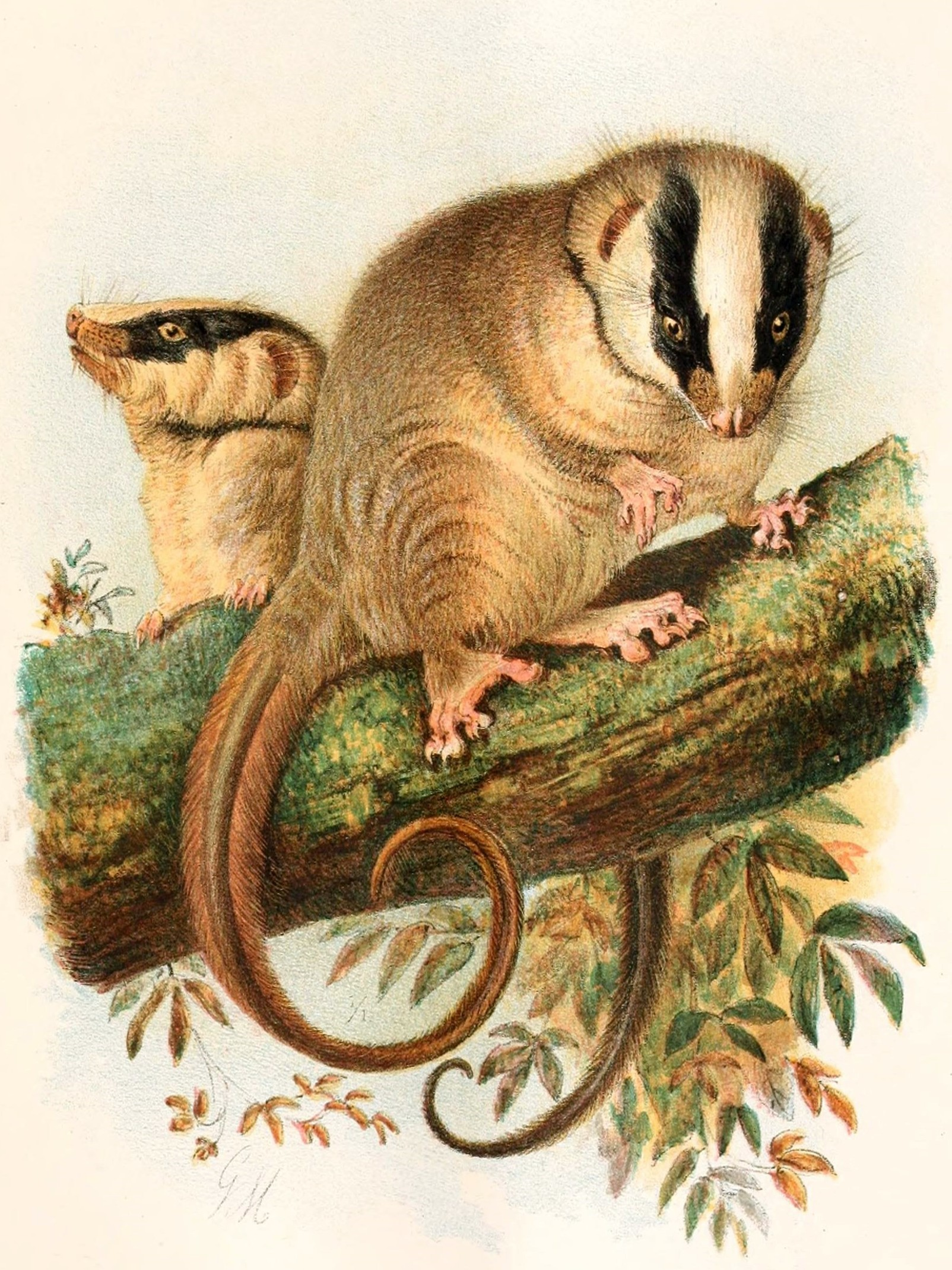

Conservation status
- Least Concern (IUCN 3.1)

Scientific classification
- Kingdom: Animalia
- Phylum: Chordata
- Class: Mammalia
- Infraclass: Marsupialia
- Order: Diprotodontia
- Family: Acrobatidae
- Genus: Distoechurus; Peters, 1874
- Species: D. pennatus

Binomial name
- Distoechurus pennatus (Peters, 1874)
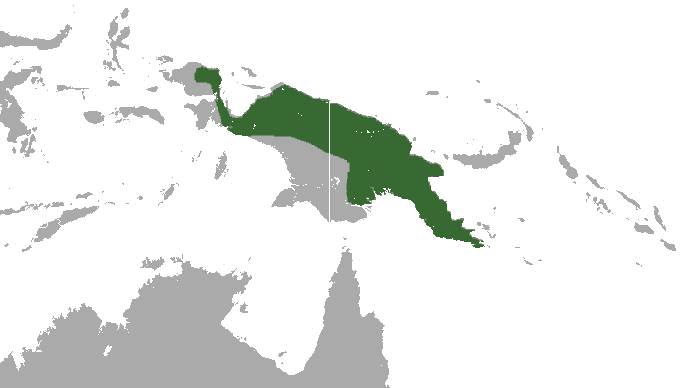
- Feather-tailed possum range

= Feather-tailed possum =

Species of marsupial

The feather-tailed possum (Distoechurus pennatus) is a species of marsupial in the family Acrobatidae. It is found in West Papua and Papua New Guinea. It is not to be confused with the feathertail glider, the only other species in the family Acrobatidae.

== Distribution ==
It is found in most of Papua New Guinea, with the exception of the southern lowlands. It lives in almost all forest types up to 1900 metres, including disturbed forest and gardens.

== Physical description ==
The head and body length is about 100 to 120 mm and the tail is 123 to 155 mm, making an overall length 223 to 275 mm. The tongue is about 21 mm long and the dorsal side of the tongue is covered in a mat of small, backward-pointing papillae (bristles) to enable the retrieval of nectar and pollen from flowers. The body coloration is dull buff to light brown to grayish. The muzzle and top of the head are striped black and white, with conspicuous black patches behind each small, naked ear. The eyes are large. The tail is naked except for the base and horizontal stiff hairs along each side, giving the appearance of a feather, hence the name, and the tip is prehensile. The feet of the possum have six pads rather than five, an adaptation for climbing, and the claws are sharp and hooked.

== Taxonomy ==
It is the only species in the genus Distoechurus.

== Food ==
The feather-tailed possum feeds on nectar and pollen, and other forest food.
