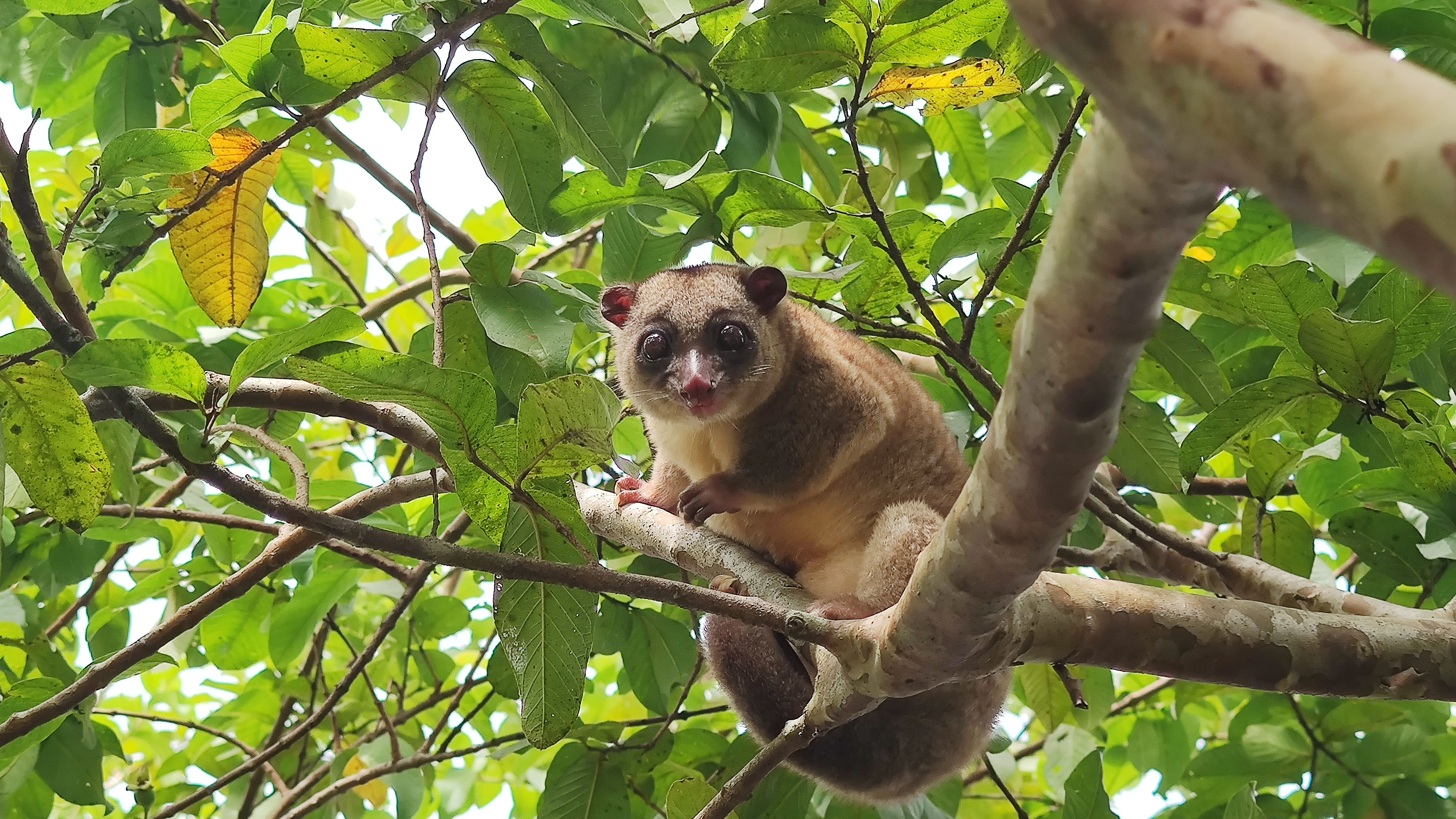

Conservation status
- Near Threatened (IUCN 3.1)

Scientific classification
- Kingdom: Animalia
- Phylum: Chordata
- Class: Mammalia
- Infraclass: Marsupialia
- Order: Diprotodontia
- Family: Phalangeridae
- Genus: Strigocuscus
- Species: S. celebensis

Binomial name
- Strigocuscus celebensis (J. E. Gray, 1858)
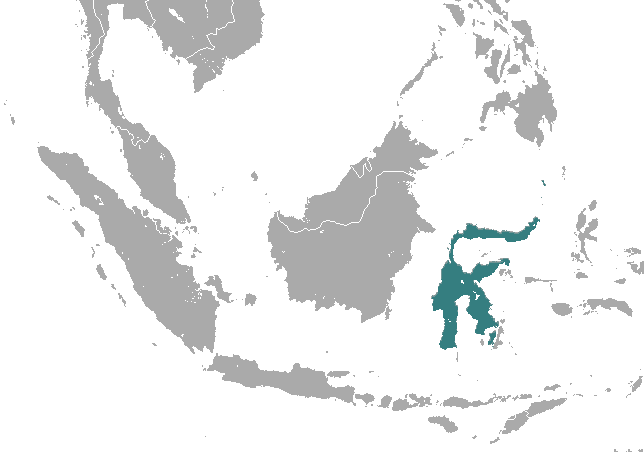
- Sulawesi dwarf cuscus range

= Sulawesi dwarf cuscus =

Species of marsupial

The Sulawesi dwarf cuscus (Strigocuscus celebensis) is a species of arboreal marsupial in the family Phalangeridae that is endemic to Sulawesi and nearby islands in Indonesia. It inhabits tropical moist lowland forest and is nocturnal, folivorous and usually found in pairs. S. celebensis is threatened by hunting and deforestation.
