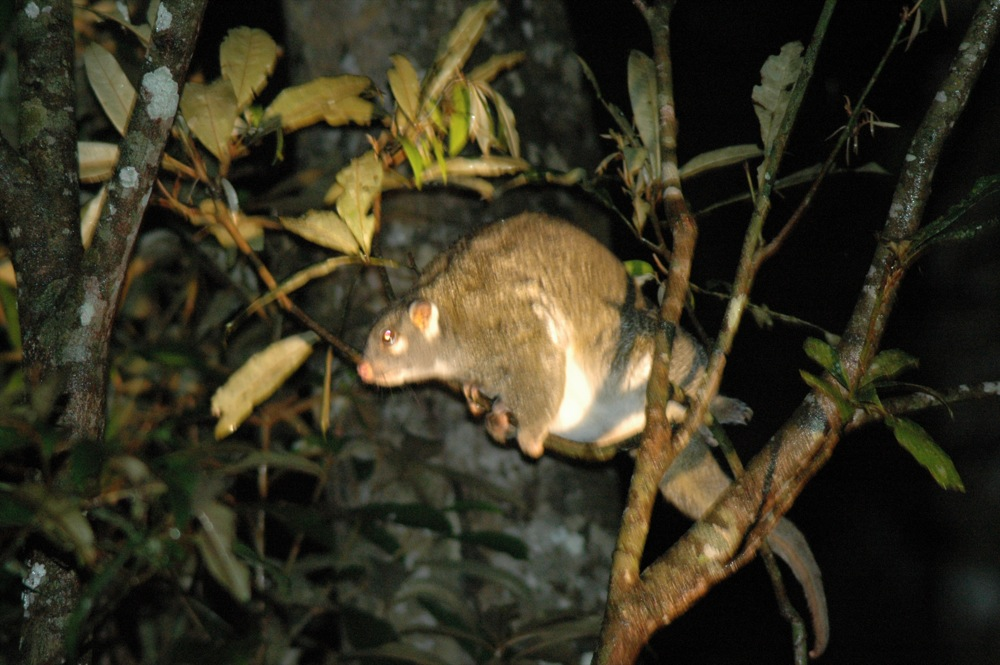
- Green ringtail possum

Scientific classification
- Domain: Eukaryota
- Kingdom: Animalia
- Phylum: Chordata
- Class: Mammalia
- Infraclass: Marsupialia
- Order: Diprotodontia
- Family: Pseudocheiridae
- Subfamily: Pseudochiropsinae; Kirsch, Lapointe and Springer, 1997
- Genus: Pseudochirops; Matschie, 1915

Type species
- Phalangista (Pseudochirus) albertisii Peters, 1874

Species
- Pseudochirops albertisii; Pseudochirops archeri; Pseudochirops corinnae; Pseudochirops coronatus; Pseudochirops cupreus

= Pseudochirops =

Genus of marsupials

False ringtail possums (Pseudochirops) are members of a genus of marsupial in the family Pseudocheiridae. It contains the following species:

- D'Albertis's ringtail possum, Pseudochirops albertisii
- Green ringtail possum, Pseudochirops archeri
- Plush-coated ringtail possum, Pseudochirops corinnae
- Reclusive ringtail possum, Pseudochirops coronatus
- Coppery ringtail possum, Pseudochirops cupreus
