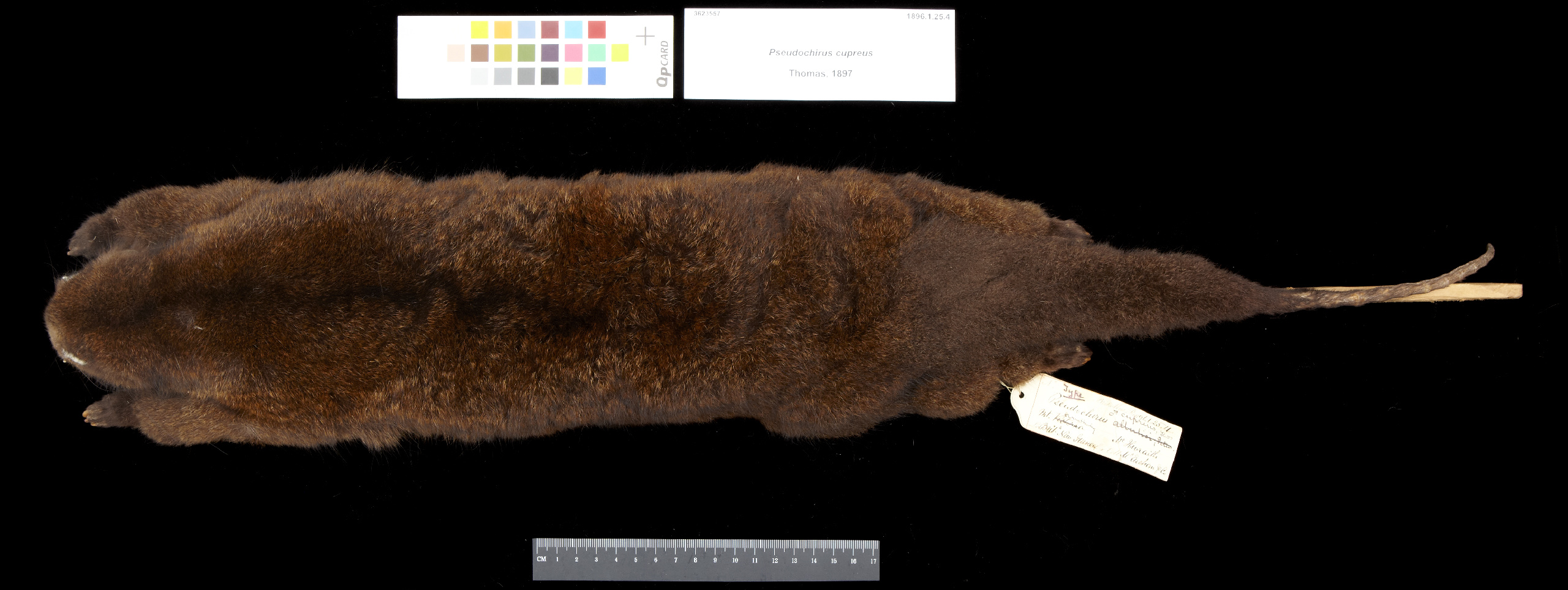

Conservation status
- Least Concern (IUCN 3.1)

Scientific classification
- Kingdom: Animalia
- Phylum: Chordata
- Class: Mammalia
- Infraclass: Marsupialia
- Order: Diprotodontia
- Family: Pseudocheiridae
- Genus: Pseudochirops
- Species: P. cupreus

Binomial name
- Pseudochirops cupreus (Thomas, 1897)
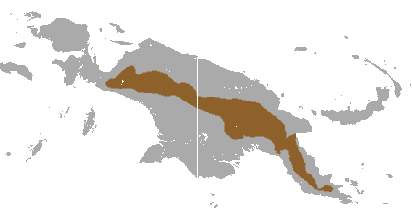
- Coppery ringtail possum range

= Coppery ringtail possum =

Species of marsupial

The coppery ringtail possum (Pseudochirops cupreus) is a species of marsupial in the family Pseudocheiridae. It is found in Indonesia and Papua New Guinea.

== Names ==
It is known as ymduŋ; bald, kagm, kas-gs, tglem-tud in the Kalam language of Papua New Guinea. While in Indonesia, it is known as niduk in Amungme and jakwa in Lani language.
