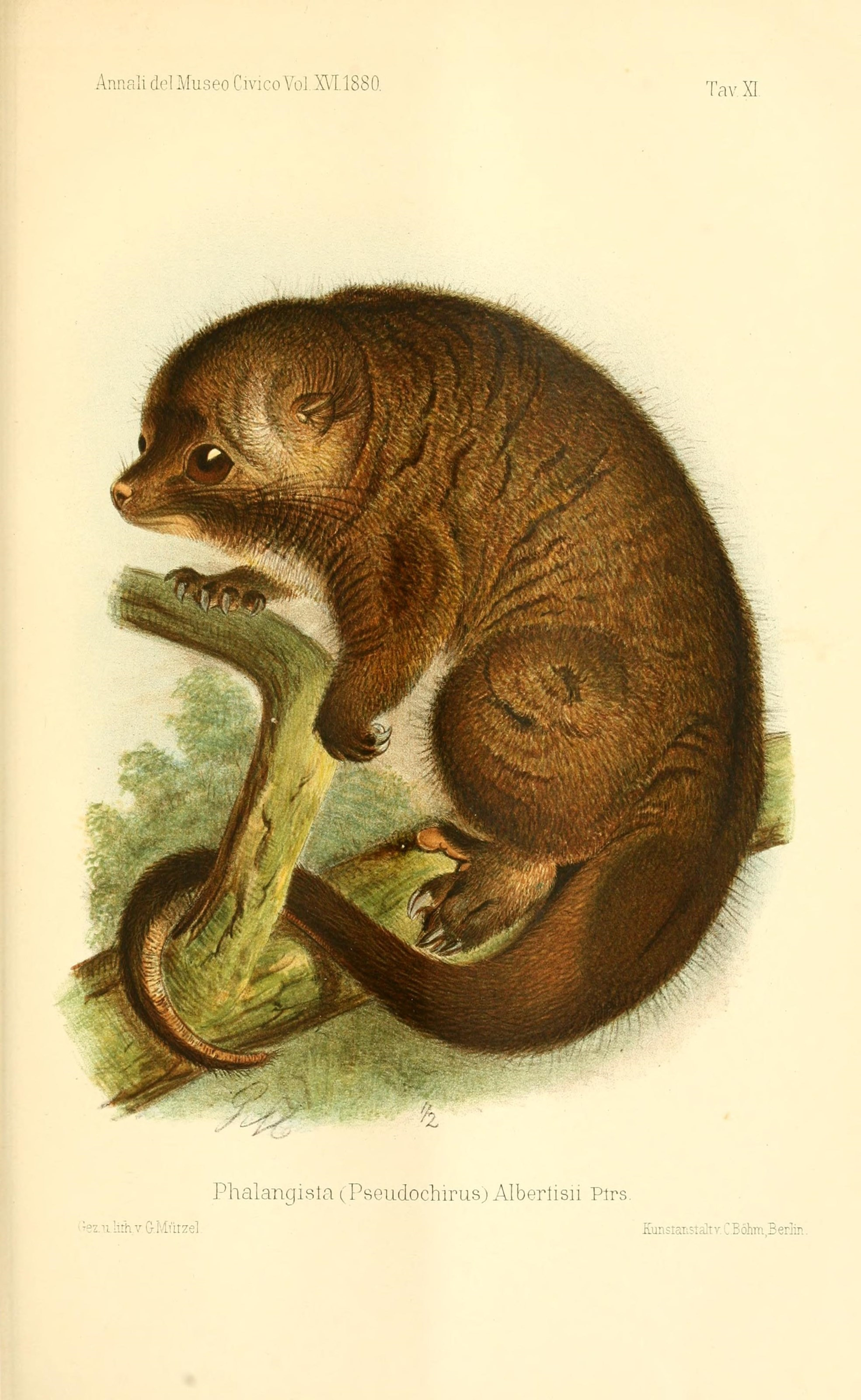

Conservation status
- Near Threatened (IUCN 3.1)

Scientific classification
- Kingdom: Animalia
- Phylum: Chordata
- Class: Mammalia
- Infraclass: Marsupialia
- Order: Diprotodontia
- Family: Pseudocheiridae
- Genus: Pseudochirops
- Species: P. albertisii

Binomial name
- Pseudochirops albertisii (Peters, 1874)
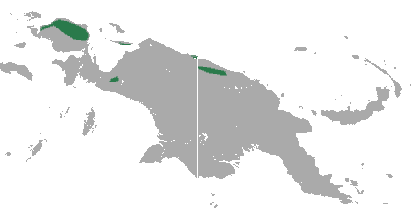
- D'Albertis' ringtail possum range

= D'Albertis's ringtail possum =

D'Albertis' ringtail possum

Species of marsupial

D'Albertis' ringtail possum (Pseudochirops albertisii) is a species of marsupial in the family Pseudocheiridae. It is found in Indonesia and Papua New Guinea. Its natural habitat is subtropical or tropical dry forests.

== Names ==
It is known locally as Mandorman in Yapen Islands, Indonesia.
