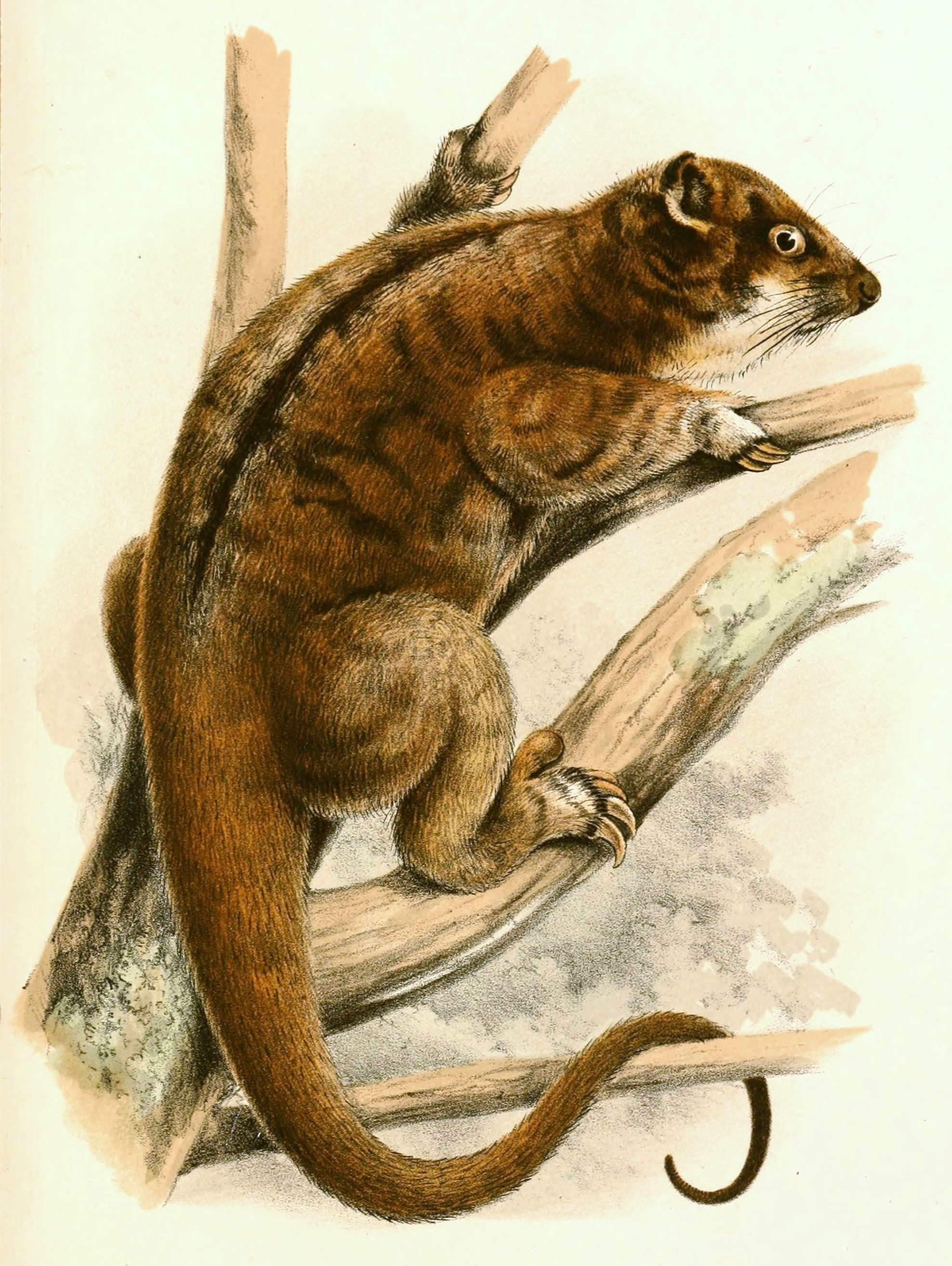

Conservation status
- Near Threatened (IUCN 3.1)

Scientific classification
- Kingdom: Animalia
- Phylum: Chordata
- Class: Mammalia
- Infraclass: Marsupialia
- Order: Diprotodontia
- Family: Pseudocheiridae
- Genus: Pseudochirops
- Species: P. corinnae

Binomial name
- Pseudochirops corinnae (Thomas, 1897)
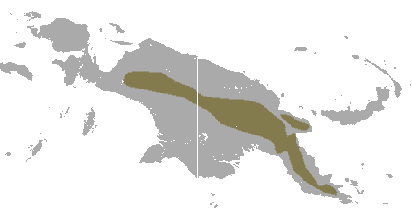
- Plush-coated ringtail possum range

= Plush-coated ringtail possum =

Species of marsupial

The plush-coated ringtail possum or golden ringtail possum (Pseudochirops corinnae) is a species of marsupial in the family Pseudocheiridae. It is found in Indonesia, Papua New Guinea, and the Solomon Islands. Its natural habitat is subtropical or tropical dry forests.

== Names ==
It is known as wcm, pungi-mdep, wlpog in the Kalam language of Papua New Guinea, while in the Kuyawage Lani language of Indonesia, it is called yumene.
