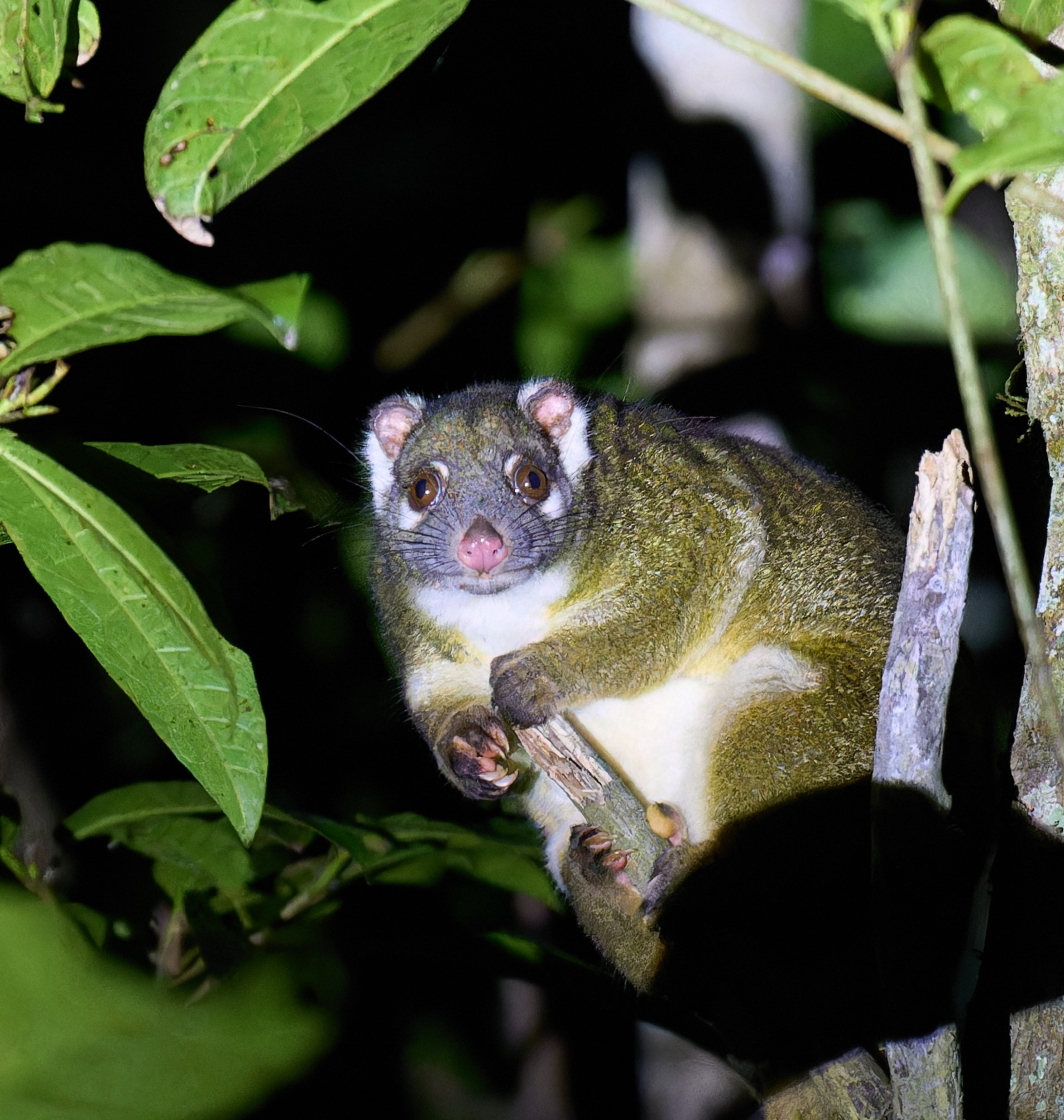

Conservation status
- Near Threatened (IUCN 3.1)

Scientific classification
- Kingdom: Animalia
- Phylum: Chordata
- Class: Mammalia
- Infraclass: Marsupialia
- Order: Diprotodontia
- Family: Pseudocheiridae
- Genus: Pseudochirops
- Species: P. archeri

Binomial name
- Pseudochirops archeri (Collett, 1884)
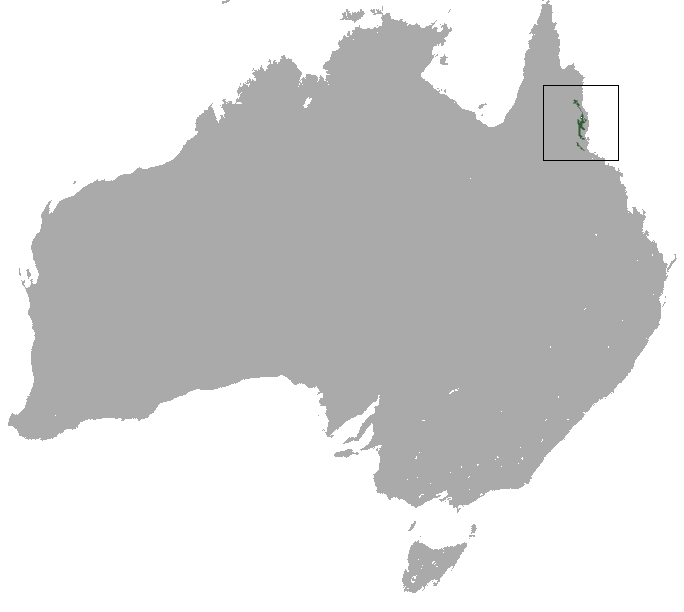
- Green ringtail possum range

Synonyms
- Phalangista archeri

= Green ringtail possum =

Species of marsupial

The green ringtail possum (Pseudochirops archeri) is a species of ringtail possum found only in northern Australia. This makes it unique in its genus, all other members of which are found in New Guinea or nearby islands. The green ringtail possum is found in a tiny area of northeastern Queensland, between Paluma and Mount Windsor Tableland.

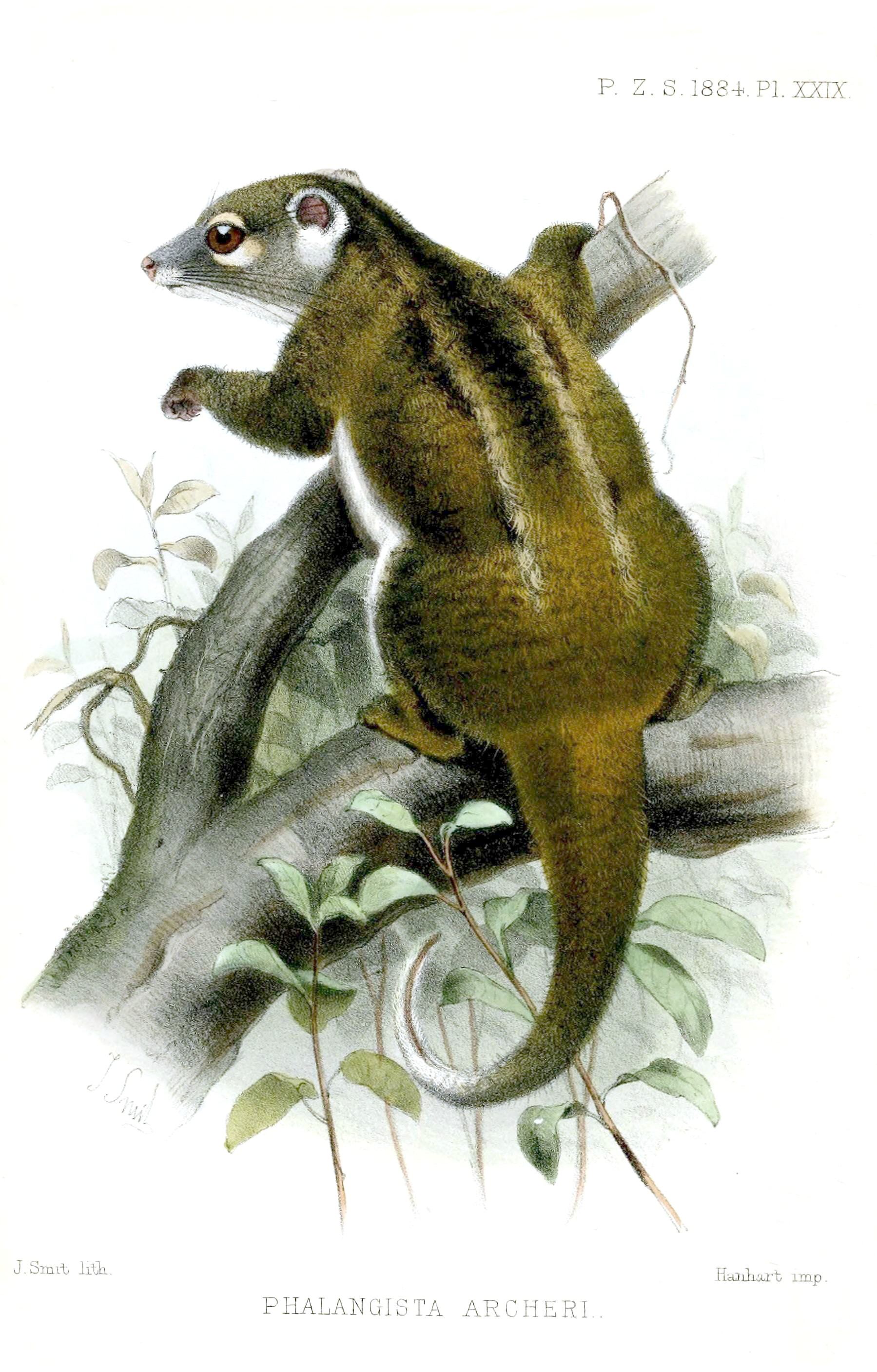

The green ringtail possum gets its name from its fur, which does indeed have a greenish tinge. In reality the fur is olive grey, but it is grizzled with silver, yellow and black hairs, which makes it appear green. It is nocturnal, solitary, and arboreal. It feeds mostly on leaves and is one of the few species that can eat the leaves of the stinger plant (Dendrocnide moroides) which can cause extreme pain with human casualties needing to be hospitalised. It also engages in a practice called coprophagy, where an animal eats its own faeces.
