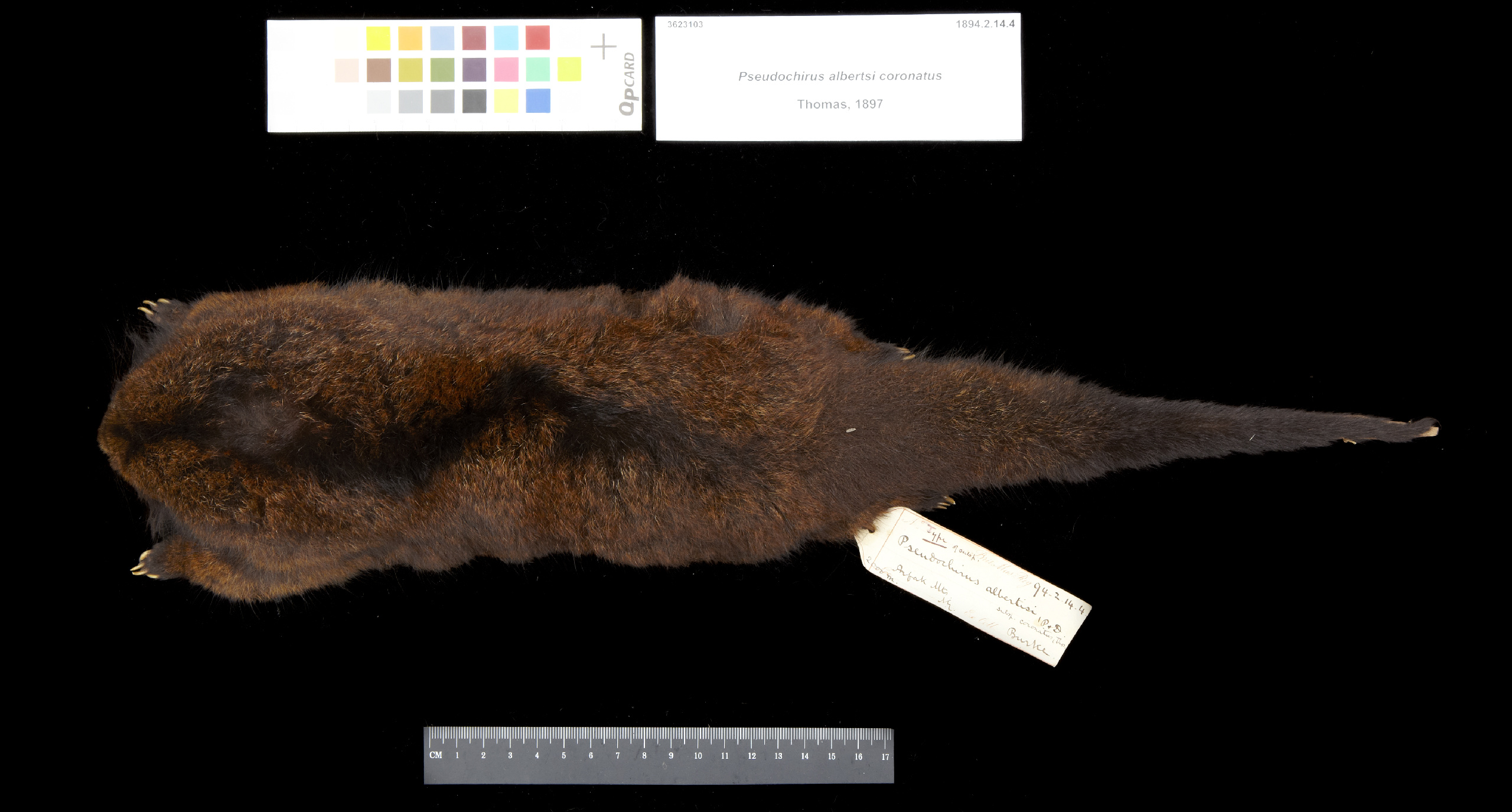

Conservation status
- Vulnerable (IUCN 3.1)

Scientific classification
- Kingdom: Animalia
- Phylum: Chordata
- Class: Mammalia
- Infraclass: Marsupialia
- Order: Diprotodontia
- Family: Pseudocheiridae
- Genus: Pseudochirops
- Species: P. coronatus

Binomial name
- Pseudochirops coronatus (Thomas, 1897)
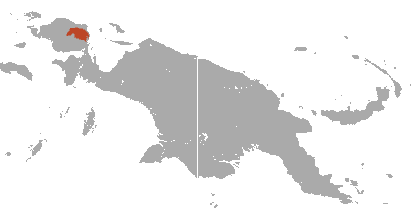
- Reclusive ringtail possum range

= Reclusive ringtail possum =

Species of marsupial

The reclusive ringtail possum or Monk ringtail possum (Pseudochirops coronatus) is a species of marsupial in the family Pseudocheiridae. It is endemic to the Arfak Mountains in the Vogelkop Peninsula of West Papua, Indonesia.
