= List of adaptive radiated marsupials by form =

This is a list of adaptive radiated marsupials by form; they are adaptively radiated marsupial species equivalent to the many niche-types of non-marsupial mammals. Many of the surviving species are from Australia. There are unique types, for example the extinct genus Nototherium, a 'rhinoceros-type'.

The new world has the common opossum, also a unique form.

Even before the mid-19th century and Charles Darwin's time, biogeographers understood speciation and animal niches. A supreme example that became known to Darwin as sailing ships traveled the world is the New Zealand flightless, ground-dwelling, worm-eating kiwi, a bird, but a species in a mammal-niche.

== Anteater-like ==
1 genus–(monotypic)
(2 subspecies)

Anteater-like marsupials
Taxa	Presence	Notes	Images
Marsupial: (anteater-like): Family-Myrmecobiidae Genus-Myrmecobius; 1. M. fasciatus (2 subspecies)	Western Australia (2 subspecies)		Numbat, also called the banded anteater

== Cat-like ==
1 genus–(6 species)

Cat-like marsupials
Taxa	Presence	Notes	Images
Marsupial: (cat-like): Order-Dasyuromorphia Family- Dasyuridae Genus-Dasyurus; 1. D. albopunctatus 2. D. geoffroii 3. D. hallucatus 4. D. maculatus 5. D. spartacus 6. D. viverrinus	Australia, New Guinea		Tiger quoll

== Groundhog-like ==
6 genera
2 surviving genera

Groundhog-like marsupials
Taxa	Presence	Notes	Images
Marsupial: (groundhog-like): Family-Vombatidae Genera; 1. 6 genera			Common wombat

== Mole-like ==
1 genus–(2 species)

Mole-like marsupials
Taxa	Presence	Notes	Images
Marsupial: (mole-like): Genus-Notoryctes; 1. N. caurinus 2. N. typhlops			Marsupial mole

== Rhinoceros-like ==
1 genus

Rhinoceros-like marsupials
Taxa	Presence	Notes	Images
Marsupial: (rhinoceros-like): Order-Diprotodontia Sub-Order-Vombatiformes Family-Diprotodontidae Genus-Nototherium	Extinct		Nototherium

== Panther-like ==
6 genera

Panther-like marsupials
Taxa	Presence	Notes	Images
Marsupial: (panther-like): Order-Diprotodontia Family-Thylacoleonidae Genus †Priscileo; 1. †Priscileo pitikantensis (Upper Oligocene); 2. †Priscileo roskellyae (Middle Miocene); Subfamily Wakaleoninae Genus †Wakaleo: 1. †Wakaleo alcootaensis (Upper Miocene); 2. †Wakaleo oldfieldi (Lower—Upper Miocene); 3. †Wakaleo vanderleueri (Middle—Upper Miocene); Subfamily Thylacoleoninae Genus †Thylacoleo: 1. †Thylacoleo carnifex (Pleistocene); 2. †Thylacoleo crassidentatus (Pliocene); 3. †Thylacoleo hilli (Pliocene)	Extinct		Thylacoleo

== Flying Squirrel-like ==
1 genus–(6 species)

Flying Squirrel-like marsupials
Taxa	Presence	Notes	Images
Marsupial: (flying squirrel-like): Genus-Petaurus; 1. P. abidi 2. P. australis 3. P. biacensis 4. P. breviceps 5. P. gracilis 6. P. norfolcensis			Sugar glider

== Canine-like ==
1 genus–(1 species)

canine-like marsupials
Taxa	Presence	Notes	Images
Marsupial: (canine-like): Order-Dasyuromorphia Family- Thylacinidae Genus-Thylacinus; 1. T. cynocephalus	Extinct		Thylacine, also called Tasmanian wolf or tiger

== Hyena-like ==
1 genus–(1 species)

Hyena-like marsupials
Taxa	Presence	Notes	Images
Marsupial: (hyena-like): Order-Dasyuromorphia Family- Dasyuridae Genus-Sarcophilus; 1. S. harrisii	Extirpated from mainland (Tasmania only)		Tasmanian devil

== Deer-like ==
- - Family Macropodidae

== Unique: opossum-like ==
? species

Unique—Opossum-like marsupials
Taxa	Presence	Notes	Images
Marsupial: (opossum-like): Infraclass-Marsupialia Family-Didelphidae Genera; 1. Many genera			Virginia opossum

== See also ==
- Marsupial
- Island ecology
- Biogeography
