= Gliding possum =

There are many different types of gliding possum, sometimes referred to as volplane possum, flying phalangers, or simply as gliders, endemic to Australia and New Guinea. Taxonomically, gliding possums occupy three genera.

Acrobates – monotypic genus

- Feathertail glider or pygmy gliding possum, Acrobates pygmaeus

Petauroides – the greater gliders

- Central greater glider, Petauroides armillatus
- Northern greater glider, Petauroides minor
- Southern greater glider, Petauroides volans

Tous - monotypic genus

- Ring-tailed glider, Tous ayamaruensis

Petaurus

- Northern glider, Petaurus abidi
- Savanna glider, Petaurus ariel
- Yellow-bellied glider, Petaurus australis
- Biak glider, Petaurus biacensis
- Sugar glider, Petaurus breviceps
- Mahogany glider, Petaurus gracilis
- Squirrel glider, Petaurus norfolcensis
- Krefft's glider, Petaurus notatus

A characteristic of all species of marsupial gliders is the partially fused (syndactylous) second and third digits on the hind feet. They achieve gliding flight by use of membranes called patagia.
