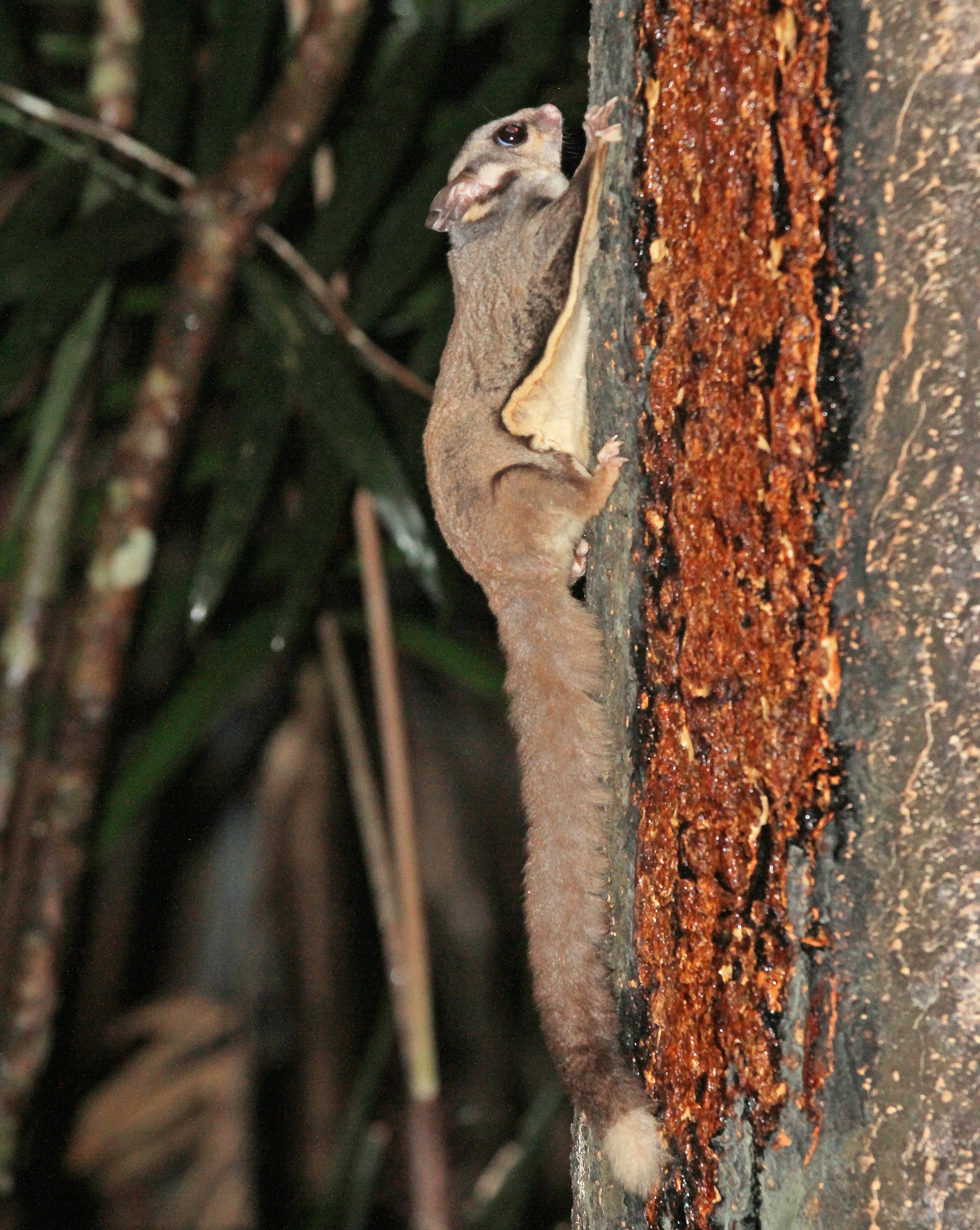
- In Crater Lakes National Park, Queensland

Scientific classification
- Kingdom: Animalia
- Phylum: Chordata
- Class: Mammalia
- Infraclass: Marsupialia
- Order: Diprotodontia
- Family: Petauridae
- Genus: Petaurus
- Species: P. notatus

Binomial name
- Petaurus notatus Peters, 1859

Synonyms
- P. (Belideus) notatus, Peters 1859

= Krefft's glider =

Krefft's glider Temporal range: Pleistocene–Recent

Species of mammal

Krefft's glider (Petaurus notatus) is a species of arboreal nocturnal gliding possum, a type of small marsupial. It is native to most of eastern mainland Australia and has been introduced to Tasmania. Populations of Petaurus from New Guinea and Indonesia previously classified under P. breviceps are also tentatively classified under P. notatus by the American Society of Mammalogists, but likely represent a complex of distinct species. As most captive gliders referred to as "sugar gliders" in at least the United States are thought to originate from West Papua, this likely makes them Krefft's gliders, at least tentatively.

== Taxonomy ==
It is closely allied with the sugar glider (P. breviceps), with which it was long taxonomically confused. A 2020 study partially clarified the taxonomy of the sugar glider and split it into three species: the savanna glider (P. ariel), the sugar glider (P. breviceps sensu stricto) and Krefft's glider (P. notatus). The large range throughout eastern Australia once attributed to the sugar glider is now thought to actually be that of Krefft's glider; under the new taxonomy, the sugar glider has a smaller range in the coastal forests of Queensland and New South Wales.

== Names ==
The species common name was suggested in 2021 after German-Australian zoologist and palaeontologist Gerard Krefft who collected the (now lost) types specimen. Petaurus notatus are also referred to as "Inland sugar glider" due to rejection of the name "Krefft's" which is counter to naming conventions of the Australian Mammal Society.

The sugar glider of Papua New Guinea, which may be this species, is known as aymows or kajben in the Kalam language of Papua New Guinea, or yegang in the Asai Valley dialect of Kalam.

== Description ==
The species can be distinguished from P. breviceps by its more clearly defined mid-dorsal stripe and a more attenuated tail, with longer fur at the base which shortens towards the tip. P. notatus also has a white tip to its tail.

== Distribution ==
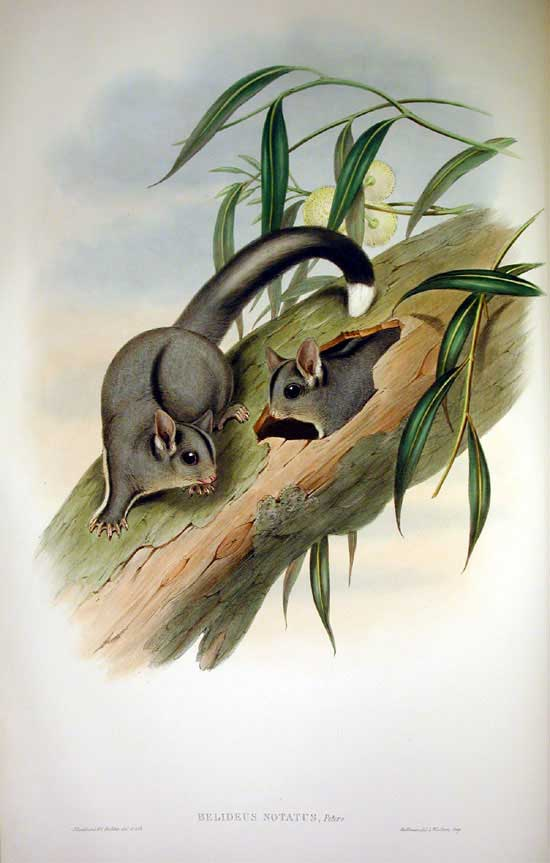
Krefft's gliders nest in eucalyptus tree hollow, John Gould, 1861

It is widely distributed throughout eastern Australia, and may be the most widespread of all Australian Petaurus species. It ranges from coastal northern Queensland (albeit not the Cape York Peninsula, which is thought to be occupied by an unknown Petaurus species that may represent P. gracilis or another species) throughout most of inland Queensland and New South Wales south to Victoria and the southeastern corner of South Australia. In southern Queensland and most of New South Wales, the Great Dividing Range serves as a barrier from the coastal areas which are occupied by the sugar glider, although their ranges may overlap in some places. The species is also sympatric with the mahogany glider and yellow-bellied glider in parts of its range. The earliest Krefft's glider (originally identified as sugar glider) fossils were found in a cave in Victoria and are dated to 15,000 years ago, at the time of the Pleistocene epoch.

Populations of Petaurus in New Guinea likely represent a distinct species complex, but have been tentatively classified within P. notatus until they can be further studied. These gliders are also found in the Bismarck Archipelago, Louisiade Archipelago, and certain isles of Indonesia, Halmahera Islands of the North Moluccas.

=== Introduction to Tasmania ===
According to naturalist Ronald Campbell Gunn, no Petaurus species is indigenous to Tasmania. He concluded that Krefft's glider (then thought to have been sugar gliders) had been brought to Launceston, Tasmania as pets from Port Phillip, Australia (now Melbourne), soon after the founding of the port in 1834. Some Krefft's gliders had escaped and quickly became established in the area. The facilitated introduction of the sugar glider to Tasmania in 1835 is supported by the absence of skeletal remains in subfossil bone deposits and the lack of an Aboriginal Tasmanian name for the animal.

The species has been identified as a threat to the survival of the swift parrot, which breeds only in Tasmania. Reduction in mature forest cover has left swift parrot nests highly vulnerable to predation by Krefft's gliders, and it is estimated that the parrot could be extinct by 2031.

== Habitat ==
They have a broad habitat niche, inhabiting rainforests and coconut plantations in New Guinea; and rainforests, wet or dry sclerophyll forest and acacia scrub in Australia; preferring habitats with Eucalypt and Acacia species. The main structural habitat requirements are a large number of stems within the canopy, and dense mid and upper canopy cover, likely to enable efficient movement through the canopy.

== In captivity ==
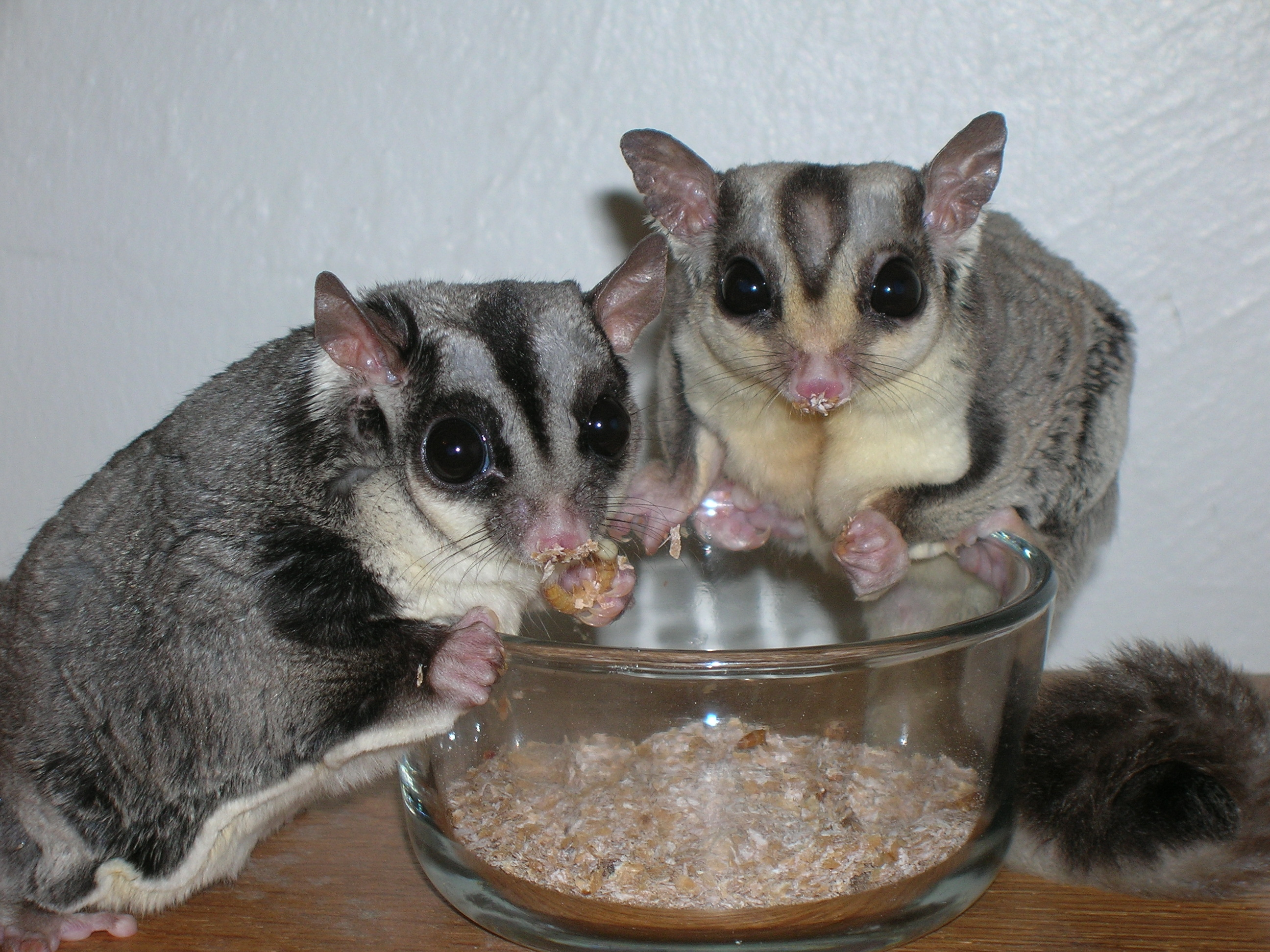
Mealworms are a favourite food for these pet gliders

It has been suggested that the expanding overseas trade in Petaurus was initiated from illegally sourced sugar gliders from Australia, which were bred for resale in Indonesia. DNA analysis, however, indicates that "the USA (sugar) glider population originates from West Papua, Indonesia with no illegal harvesting from other native areas such as Papua New Guinea or Australia". Furthermore, this study (which preceded the break-up of P. breviceps into P. notatus, P. ariel and P. breviceps) indicated that West Papuan Petaurus gliders and their US pet trade derivatives belong to a sister group to the Australian Petaurus gliders.

There have been media and internet articles which evidence a history of cruelty, and reporting on why Krefft's gliders should not be kept as pets. There are glider rescue organisations that cope with surrendered and abandoned Krefft's gliders.

Krefft's gliders are popular as pets in the United States, where they are bred in large numbers. Most states and cities allow Krefft's gliders as pets, but they are prohibited in California, Hawaii, Alaska, and New York City. In 2014, Massachusetts changed its law, allowing Krefft's gliders to be kept as pets. Some other states require permits or licensing. Breeders of Krefft's gliders are regulated and licensed by the US Department of Agriculture (USDA) Animal and Plant Health Inspection Service (APHIS) through the Animal Welfare Act.
