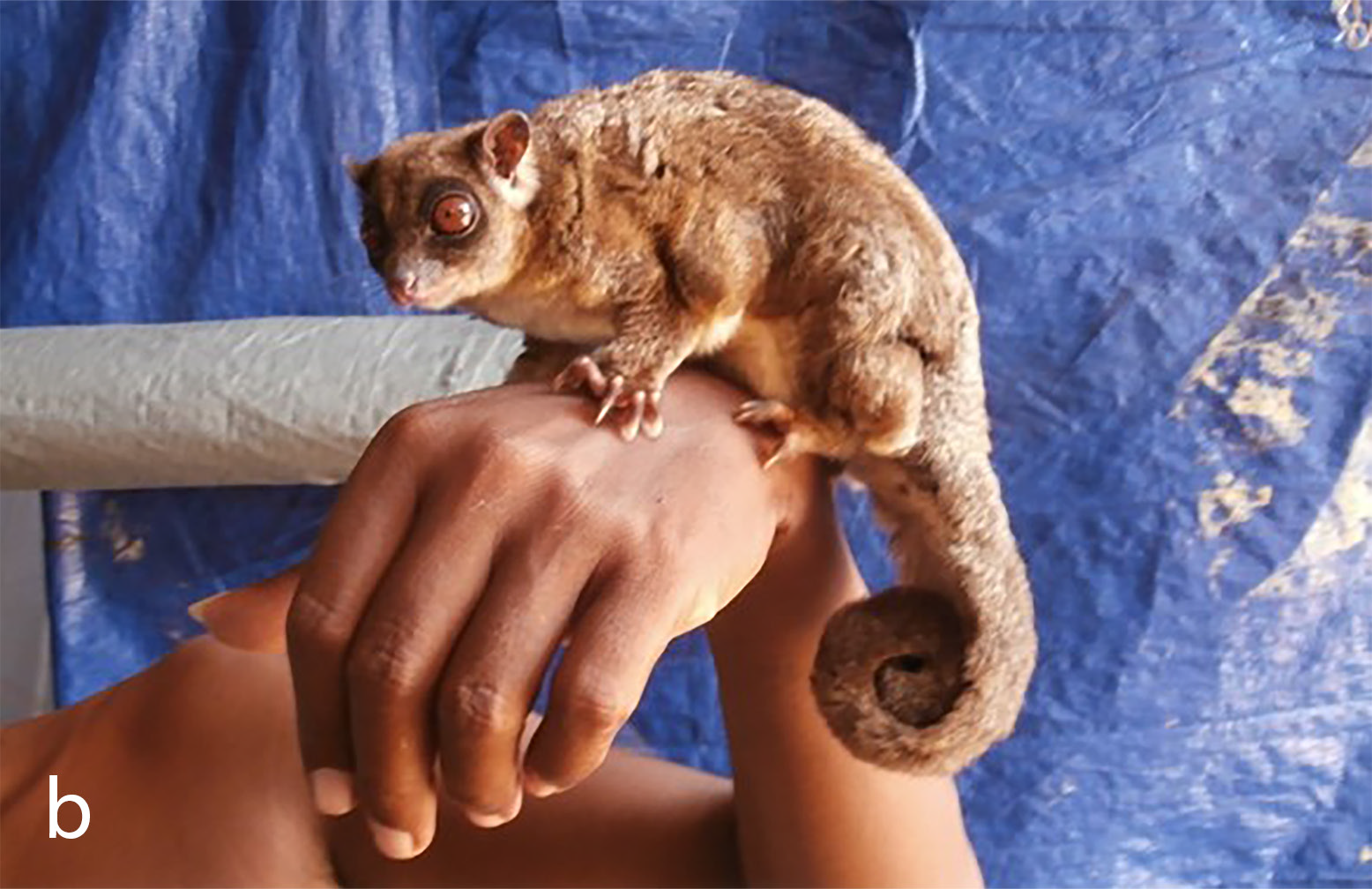
- Subadult individual of Tous ayamaruensis in South Sorong

Scientific classification
- Kingdom: Animalia
- Phylum: Chordata
- Class: Mammalia
- Infraclass: Marsupialia
- Order: Diprotodontia
- Family: Pseudocheiridae
- Subfamily: Hemibelideinae
- Genus: Tous; Flannery & Helgen, 2026

Type species
- Petauroides ayamaruensis Aplin, 1999

Species
- Tous ayamaruensis (Aplin, 1999); †Tous stirtoni (Turnbull & Lundelius, 1970)

= Tous (mammal) =

Genus of marsupials

Tous is a genus of marsupial in the family Pseudocheiridae endemic to New Guinea and Australia. It contains two named species, the ring-tailed glider T. ayamaruensis (the type species) and T. stirtoni, both of which were originally described entirely based on fossils and presumed to be extinct. In the years following 2015, multiple sightings of T. ayamaruensis indicated it is still alive, making it a Lazarus species. Tous is characterized by the unique combination of both a strongly prehensile tail (also known in Hemibelideus) and a well-developed patagium (gliding membrane; also known in Petauroides). It is further distinguished from its closest relatives in the subfamily Hemibelideinae by its very small size, naked ears, ear ring, and non-bushy, tapering tail.

The genus Tous was described in 2026 by biologists Tim Flannery and Kristofer M. Helgen in a co-authored, collaborative paper with several other scientists. The scientists acknowledged the role of traditional landowners and their knowledge of T. ayamaruensis in their work. In the Maybrat language, the vernacular name for T. ayamaruensis is 'tous'.

Little is known of the behaviors and diet of T. ayamaruensis. It is a nocturnal, monogamous species that produces young once a year and eats leaves, tree sap, and maybe also invertebrates or fruit.

The species is threatened by habitat loss due to logging of forests in Papua New Guinea and West Papua.
