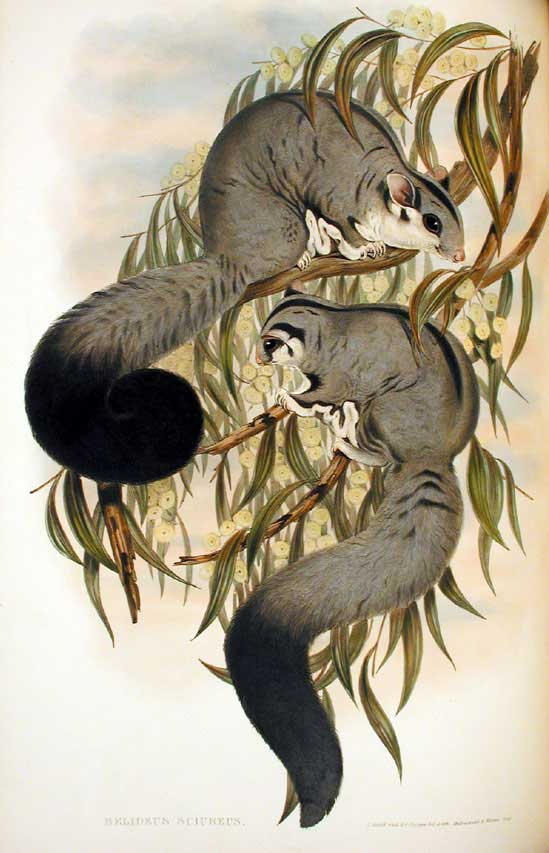

Conservation status
- Least Concern (IUCN 3.1)

Scientific classification
- Kingdom: Animalia
- Phylum: Chordata
- Class: Mammalia
- Infraclass: Marsupialia
- Order: Diprotodontia
- Family: Petauridae
- Genus: Petaurus
- Species: P. norfolcensis

Binomial name
- Petaurus norfolcensis (Kerr, 1792)
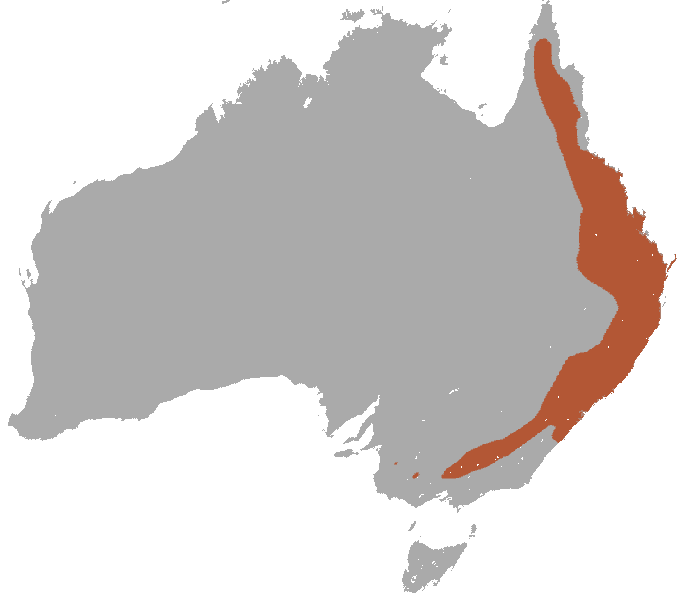
- distribution

= Squirrel glider =

Species of marsupial

The squirrel glider (Petaurus norfolcensis) is a nocturnal gliding possum and is one of the wrist-winged gliders of the genus Petaurus.

== Habitat ==
The home range of this species extends from Bordertown near the South Australia/Victorian Border, through south-eastern Australia to northern Queensland. It was thought to be extinct in South Australia since 1939, until a genetic test confirmed they still inhabited the area.

In south-eastern Australia the squirrel glider lives in the dry sclerophyll forest and woodlands, whilst in Queensland they occupy a wetter eucalypt forest.

The squirrel glider will make a den in a hollow tree and line it with leaves. Here it will sleep, usually living in groups of one male, two females and their offspring.

== Description ==
Like most of the wrist-winged gliders, the squirrel glider is endemic to Australia. It is about twice the size of the related sugar glider (P. breviceps), with a body that is 18–23 cm (7.1–9.1 in) long and a tail measuring 22–33 cm (8.7–13.0 in). It weighs around 230 g (8.1 oz) and has blue-grey or brown-grey fur on its back and a white belly. The end of the tail is black and there is a black stripe from the eyes to the middle of the back. It has a flying membrane that extends from its 5th front toe to the back of its foot on both sides. When it glides, its prehensile tail acts as a rudder, allowing it to steer in the direction it wants to go. It can glide up to 50 m (160 ft) from tree to tree, but tends not to glide in captivity.

== Reproduction ==
The breeding season is between June and January and the gestation period is 18 days. The litter sizes are usually one to two offspring a year, who will immediately crawl to the mother's marsupium and anchor themselves to a teat where they will stay for about 3 months. The mother will wean her offspring for around 4 months while they stay in the den. They become independent at 10 months and will leave the den; their life expectancy is 4–6 years.

== Diet ==
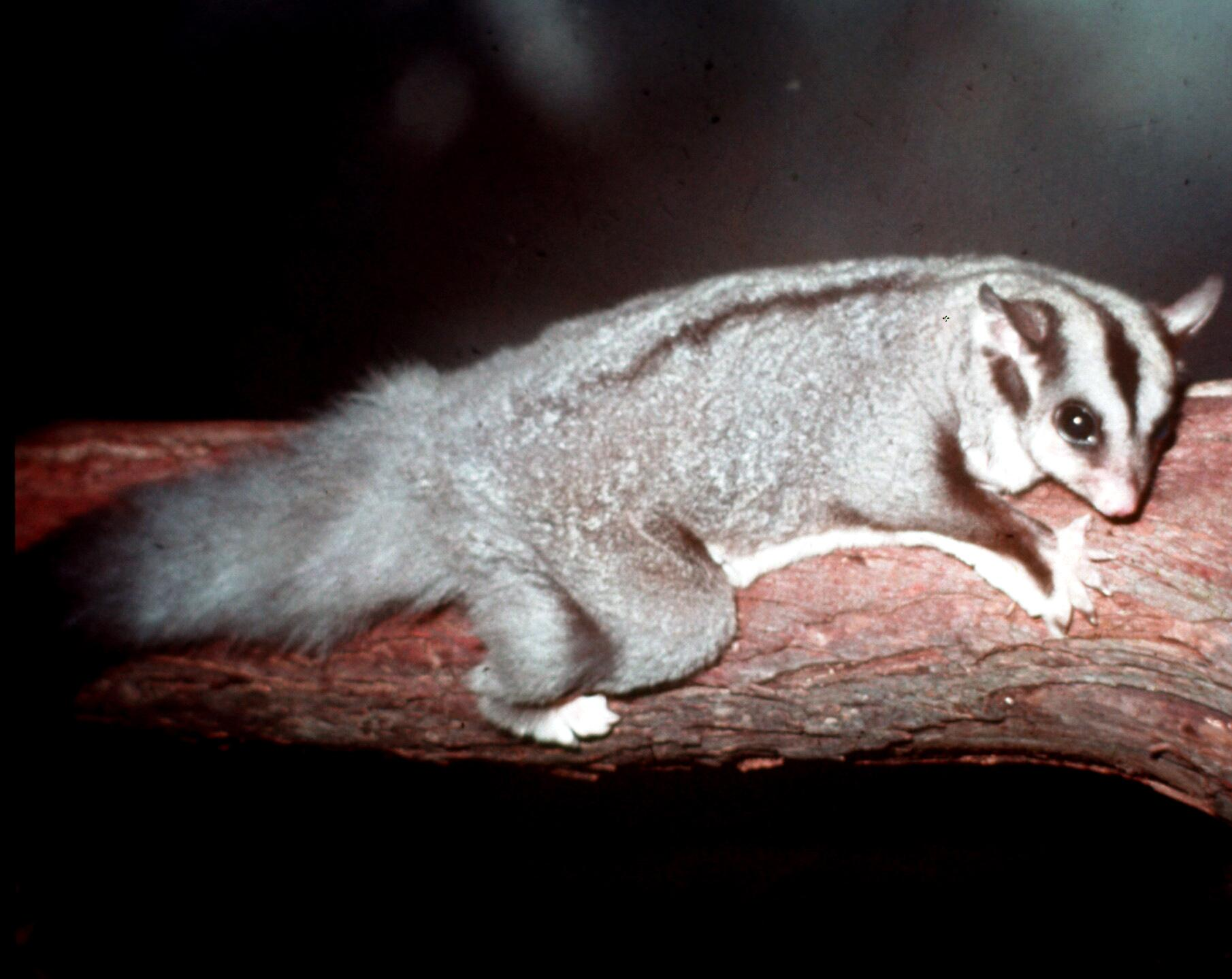
Squirrel glider at Lone Pine Koala Sanctuary

The squirrel glider eats mostly fruit and insects. It also feeds on tree sap, mainly eucalyptus or red bloodwood trees. In order to get the sap, the squirrel glider will pierce the trunk of the tree causing sap to flow out of it. It also eats pollen, nectar, leaves, and bark.

== Threats ==
Natural predators of the squirrel glider include owls and introduced predators such as dogs, cats and foxes. Habitat fragmentation and destruction by human agency is also impacting individual populations; however, due to large population sizes and occurrence in several protected areas, the species is currently classified as Least Concern by the IUCN.

== Phylogeny ==
The squirrel glider's closest relatives come from the same genus, Petaurus, and they include the sugar glider (P. breviceps), mahogany glider (P. gracilis), northern glider (P. abidi), Biak glider (P. biacensis) and yellow-bellied glider (P. australis). It is not yet known which species the gliders diverged from. The squirrel glider most likely evolved from a marsupial like a possum that had membranes for gliding. Other animals that have this same ancestor include striped possum and Leadbeater's possum.

== Analogous structures ==
Squirrel gliders are often mistaken for the flying squirrels of North America. These two species are not related at all, as the flying squirrel is a placental mammal and the squirrel glider is a marsupial (like koalas and kangaroos). Both have an adaptation for tree living as a result of the patagia, which is the skin that extends from their front to hind legs, allowing them to glide between the trees, avoiding predators they might come into contact with on the ground.

== Homologous structures ==
Squirrel gliders are able to curl their tails around branches to hold on. This feature is homologous to the ring tail possum (order of Diprotodontia), which use their tail as an extra limb to grab hold of trees (their tail is longer but the squirrel glider's is bushier).
