= Northern glider =

Conservation status
- Critically Endangered (IUCN 3.1)

Scientific classification
- Kingdom: Animalia
- Phylum: Chordata
- Class: Mammalia
- Infraclass: Marsupialia
- Order: Diprotodontia
- Family: Petauridae
- Genus: Petaurus
- Species: P. abidi

Binomial name
- Petaurus abidi Ziegler, 1981
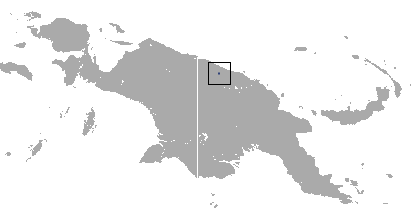
- Northern glider range

Species of marsupial

The northern glider (Petaurus abidi) is a species of marsupial in the family Petauridae. It is endemic to Papua New Guinea, becoming known to science in 1981 after being discovered in the Torricelli Mountains. This species has been found in primary, mid-montane tropical moist forests. It is also known from rural gardens close to forest. The northern glider is Critically Endangered because its occurrence is less than 100 km^{2} (39 sq mi), all individuals are located within a single area, and a continuing decline of its habitat quality due to deforestation and human encroachment. It also faces a major threat from hunting.

== Appearance ==
The northern glider ranges in weight of 228–332 grams (8.0–11.7 oz). Its silky-like fur is gray on the top half, paler on the bottom regions, and includes the characteristic dark dorsal stripe of the family Petauridae that typically begins from the head extending to the base of tail.

== Initial discovery ==
Petaurus abidi was discovered and officially described by Alan C. Ziegler in 1981. While Ziegler was doing work in the Torricelli Mountains, Papua New Guinea he came across this new species. Ziegler's work on Petaurs abidi was recorded in the Journal of Australian Mammalogy, where he recorded specifics on its appearance along with noted similarities and differences between other known species in the genus Petaurus.

== Taxonomy and systematics ==
During the discovery of Petaurus abidi, Ziegler identified the species as a member of the genus Petaurus within the Petauridae family. This species was fourth to be added to the genus making it a relative of the sugar glider, the squirrel glider and the yellow-bellied glider.

Ziegler linked Petaurus abidi to be a common ancestor of smaller gliders rather than larger gliders, despite Petarurus abidi being a larger glider itself. The northern glider followed several traits of smaller gliders, including ear and claw proportions, coloration, markings, and skull and dental characteristics. Along with all of the physical similarities, some biogeographical evidence also followed smaller gliders, like Petaurus breviceps, which are widely distributed along Papua New Guinea and large gliders were not found in that area at the time.

In Ziegler's account of the species, he noted Petaurus abidi most likely diverged from a common ancestor of the smaller gliders and underwent a size increase rather than migrating from an area where the larger gliders are present.

== Habitat ==
The northern glider was found in the Torricelli Mountains of the northwestern coastal Papua New Guinea. More specifically the northern gliders collected by Alan C. Ziegler were found in the Lumi District of the West Sepik province. This species was noted in Ziegler's discovery to reside at an elevation of approximately 1,000 m (3,300 ft).

== Reproduction ==
During a collection one lactating female was collected during the month of March, on another occasion a female was caught with, its young in its pouch also in the month of March. The young that was also collected was still developing hair on its head indicating it was less than a month old.

== Conservation status ==
According to the IUCN Red List, Petaurus abidi is critically endangered. The only known area that it is found in is the Torricelli Mountains in Papua New Guinea.
