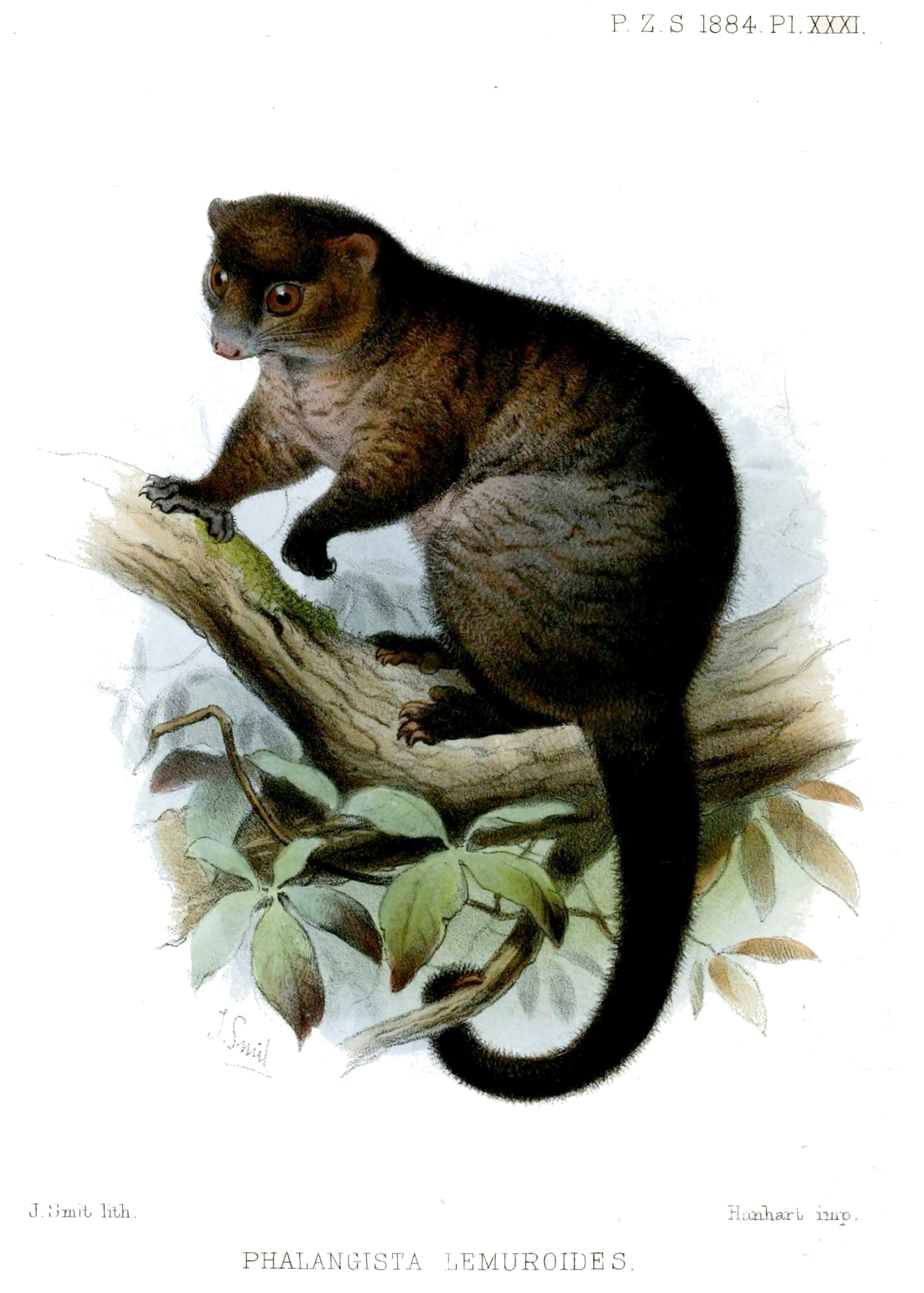

Conservation status
- Near Threatened (IUCN 3.1)

Scientific classification
- Kingdom: Animalia
- Phylum: Chordata
- Class: Mammalia
- Infraclass: Marsupialia
- Order: Diprotodontia
- Family: Pseudocheiridae
- Subfamily: Hemibelideinae
- Genus: Hemibelideus; Collett, 1884
- Species: H. lemuroides

Binomial name
- Hemibelideus lemuroides (Collett, 1884)
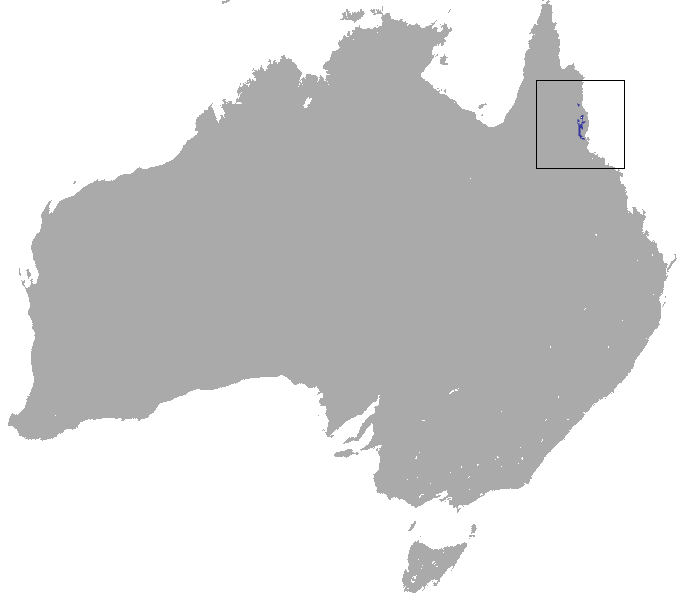
- Lemuroid ringtail possum range

= Lemuroid ringtail possum =

Species of marsupial

The lemuroid ringtail possum (Hemibelideus lemuroides), also known as the lemur-like ringtail possum or the brushy-tailed ringtail, is a truly singular member of the ringtail possum group. It was once thought that they were greater gliders (Petauroides volans); Hemibelideus literally translates as "half-glider" (belideus being a diminutive form of Petaurus, meaning "glider"). Named for their facial characteristics visually similar to the unrelated primate lemurs, with short snouts, large, forward-facing eyes and small ears, they are similar to other gliding possums in their musculo-skeletal adaptations to accommodate a leaping lifestyle. Their long, prehensile tail is a further adaptation to their arboreal habitat.

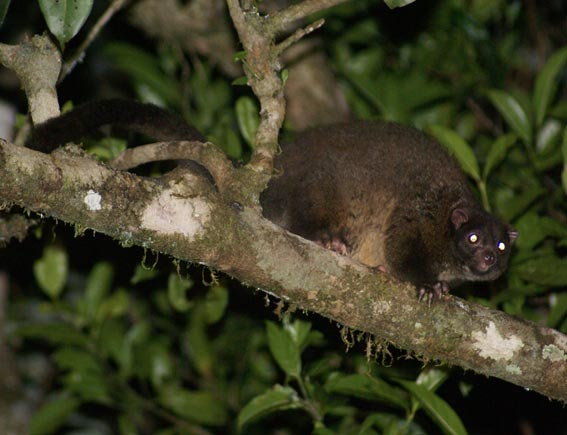
In Queensland, Australia

It has a bushier tail when compared to other ringtails, and can be distinguished from the greater glider by its lack of gliding membrane and much shorter, hairless ears. It is a social possum, and is found in two main colour forms: the more common brownish-gray form, with a yellowish underbelly, and a rare white form, which occurred in the Daintree Rainforest and was last seen in 2005 in Mount Lewis National Park, and in 2008 believed to have been nearly extinct.

This possum is found in a small area of only about 300,000 hectares in total, between Ingham and Cairns in Queensland, Australia, and in an isolated population on the Mount Carbine Tableland, both within the Wet Tropics World Heritage Area. They are strictly arboreal and live in the high canopies of mature forests and favour particular tree types, usually found above 480–900 metres in elevation. Body length is 30–38 cm and tail length 30–35 cm, weighing between 810 and 1140 grams.

Stephen Williams, researcher on climate change and biodiversity at the Centre for Tropical Biodiversity and Climate Change at James Cook University, Queensland, stated that none were seen for several years after the heat waves of 2005, when first a few were spotted (three were observed in the Daintree National Park, on Cape York Peninsula in 2009) then increasing numbers as they slowly recovered. Williams said in 2009 that there was no reason to believe the white variant would be impacted more than the brown.

Then the next heatwave in struck in November 2018, when the Cairns region was hit by the highest temperatures since records began – even the highest mountain in the wet tropics reached 39 °C. Many tropical species cannot cope with extreme heat, not having evolved mechanisms to cool their bodies down, according to Williams; they can die from temperatures above 29 degrees. He said that over the past 15 years systematically species have started to disappear from the lower elevations, causing the total populations to decline as they are constrained to smaller areas at higher elevations. This puts pressure on creatures living in the mountain summits such as the lemuroid possum, which have nowhere else to go; the nearest rainforest is 1000 kilometres away.
