= Gliding flight =

Mode of flight

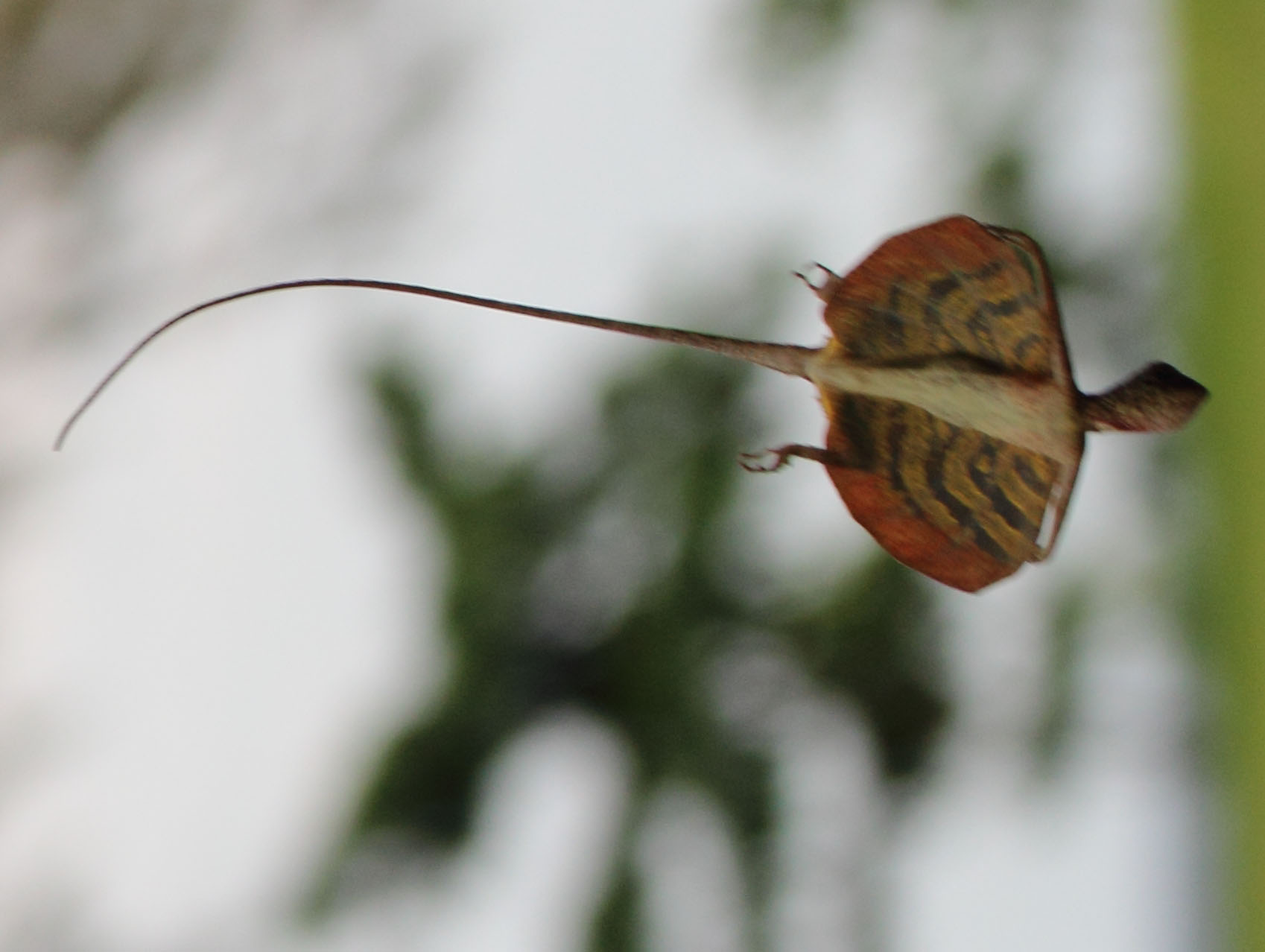
Gliding Draco taeniopterus, a so-called "flying lizard"

Gliding flight is heavier-than-air flight without the use of thrust; the term volplaning also refers to this mode of flight in animals. It is employed by gliding animals and by aircraft such as gliders. This mode of flight involves flying a significant distance horizontally compared to its descent and therefore can be distinguished from a mostly straight downward descent like a round parachute.

Although the human application of gliding flight usually refers to aircraft designed for this purpose, most powered aircraft are capable of gliding without engine power. As with sustained flight, gliding generally requires the application of an airfoil, such as the wings on aircraft or birds, or the gliding membrane of a gliding possum. However, gliding can be achieved with a flat (uncambered) wing, as with a simple paper plane, or even with card-throwing. However, some aircraft with lifting bodies and animals such as the flying snake can achieve gliding flight without any wings by creating a flattened surface underneath.

== Glider aircraft ==
Most winged aircraft can glide to some extent, but there are several types of aircraft designed to glide:

- Glider, also known as a sailplane
- Hang glider
- Paraglider
- Speed glider
- Ram-air parachute
- Rotor kite, if untethered, known as a rotary glider, or gyroglider.
- Military glider
- Paper aeroplane
- Radio-controlled glider
- Rocket glider
- Wingsuit

The main human application is currently recreational, though during the Second World War military gliders were used for carrying troops and equipment into battle. The types of aircraft that are used for sport and recreation are classified as gliders (sailplanes), hang gliders and paragliders. These two latter types are often foot-launched. The design of all three types enables them to repeatedly climb using rising air and then to glide before finding the next source of lift. When done in gliders (sailplanes), the sport is known as gliding and sometimes as soaring. For foot-launched aircraft, it is known as hang gliding and paragliding. Radio-controlled gliders with fixed wings are also soared by enthusiasts.

In addition to motor gliders, some powered aircraft are designed for routine glides during part of their flight; usually when landing after a period of a powered flight. These include:

- Experimental aircraft such as the North American X-15, which glided back having used their fuel
- Spacecraft such as the Space Shuttles, SpaceShipOne and the Russian Buran

Aircraft which are not designed for glide may forced to perform gliding flight in an emergency, such as all engine failure or fuel exhaustion. See list of airline flights that required gliding flight.

== Gliding animals ==
=== Birds ===
A number of animals have separately evolved gliding many times, without any single ancestor. Birds in particular use gliding flight to minimise their use of energy. Large birds are notably adept at gliding, including:

- Albatross
- Condor
- Vulture
- Eagle
- Stork
- Frigatebird

Like recreational aircraft, birds can alternate periods of gliding with periods of soaring in rising air, and so spend a considerable time airborne with a minimal expenditure of energy. The great frigatebird in particular is capable of continuous flights up to several weeks.

=== Mammals ===
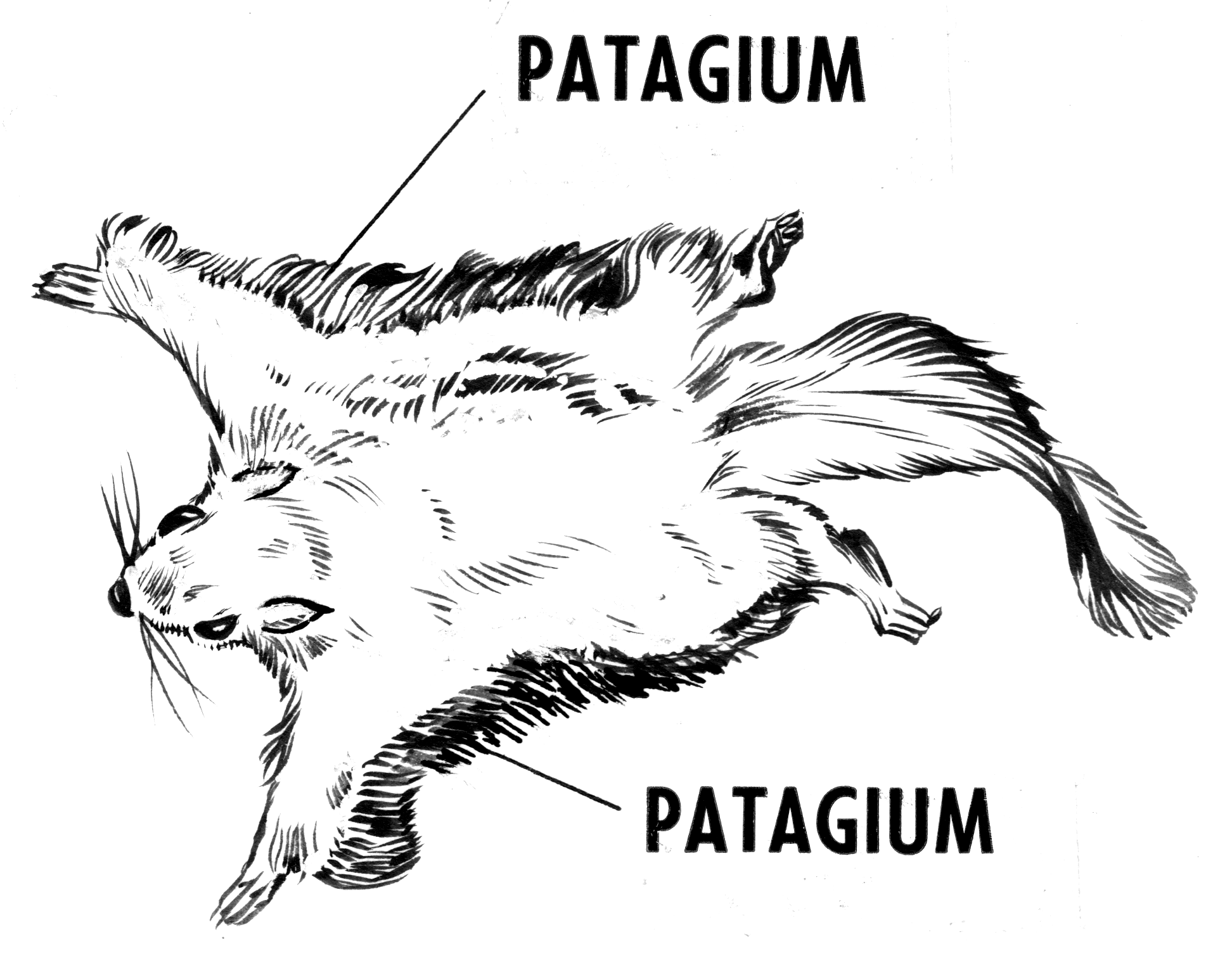
Patagia on a flying squirrel

To assist gliding, some mammals have evolved a structure called the patagium. This is a membranous structure found stretched between a range of body parts. It is most highly developed in bats. For similar reasons to birds, bats can glide efficiently. In bats, the skin forming the surface of the wing is an extension of the skin of the abdomen that runs to the tip of each digit, uniting the forelimb with the body. The patagium of a bat has four distinct parts:

1. Propatagium: the patagium present from the neck to the first digit
2. Dactylopatagium: the portion found within the digits
3. Plagiopatagium: the portion found between the last digit and the hindlimbs
4. Uropatagium: the posterior portion of the body between the two hindlimbs

Other mammals such as gliding possums and flying squirrels also glide using a patagium, but with much poorer efficiency than bats. They cannot gain height. The animal launches itself from a tree, spreading its limbs to expose the gliding membranes, usually to get from tree to tree in rainforests as an efficient means of both locating food and evading predators. This form of arboreal locomotion is common in tropical regions such as Borneo and Australia, where the trees are tall and widely spaced.

In flying squirrels, the patagium stretches from the fore- to the hind-limbs along the length of each side of the torso. In the sugar glider, the patagia extend between the fifth finger of each hand to the first toe of each foot. This creates an aerofoil enabling them to glide 50 metres or more. This gliding flight is regulated by changing the curvature of the membrane or moving the legs and tail.

=== Fish, reptiles, amphibians and other gliding animals ===
Video of a gliding Draco lizard, showing the attachment of the forelimbs to the gliding membranes, which are used to adjust trajectory during flight

In addition to mammals and birds, other animals notably flying fish, flying snakes, flying frogs and flying squid also glide.

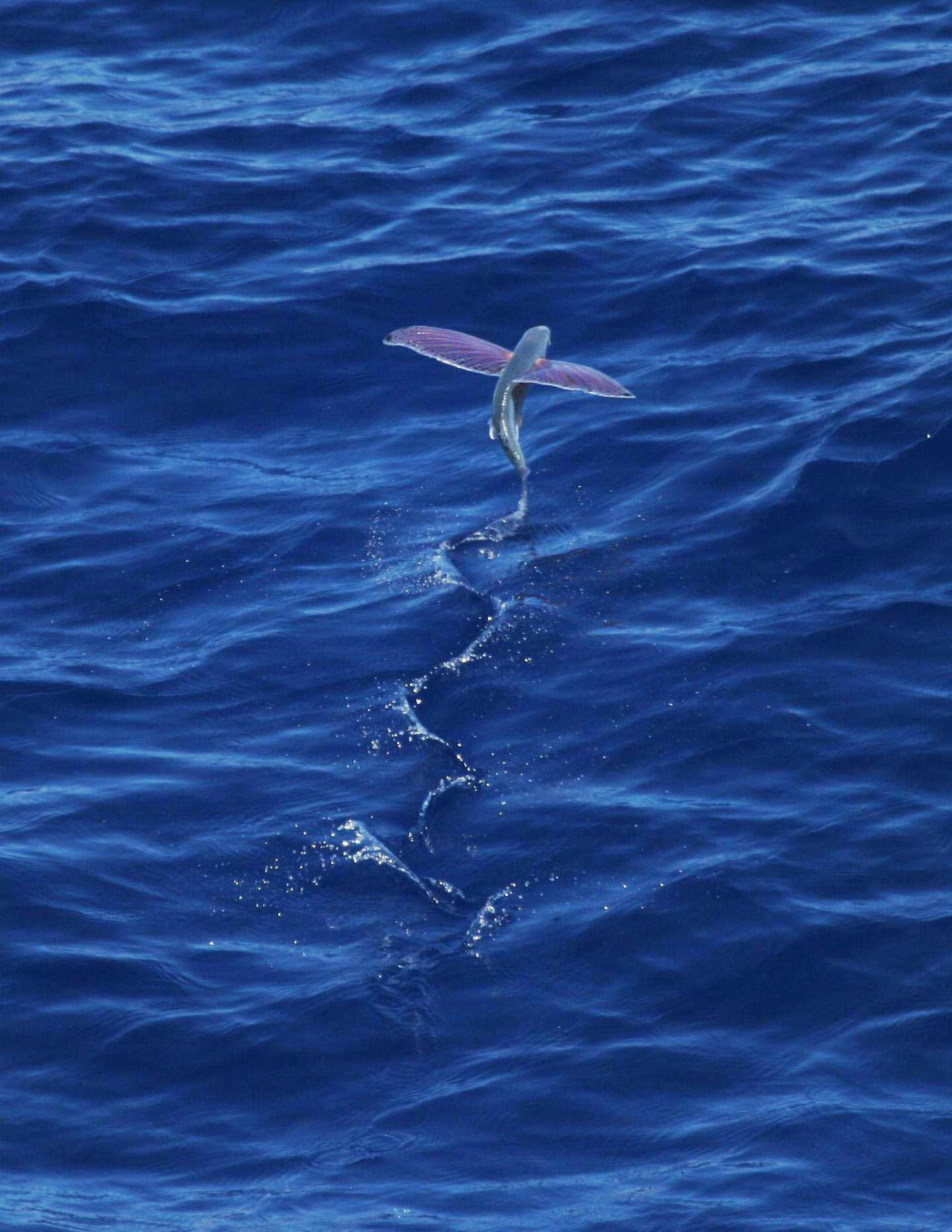
Flying fish taking off

The flights of flying fish are typically around 50 meters (160 ft), though they can use updrafts at the leading edge of waves to cover distances of up to 400 m (1,300 ft). To glide upward out of the water, a flying fish moves its tail up to 70 times per second. It then spreads its pectoral fins and tilts them slightly upward to provide lift. At the end of a glide, it folds its pectoral fins to re-enter the sea, or drops its tail into the water to push against the water to lift itself for another glide, possibly changing direction. The curved profile of the "wing" is comparable to the aerodynamic shape of a bird wing. The fish is able to increase its time in the air by flying straight into or at an angle to the direction of updrafts created by a combination of air and ocean currents.

Snakes of the genus Chrysopelea are also known by the common name "flying snake". Before launching from a branch, the snake makes a J-shape bend. After thrusting its body up and away from the tree, it sucks in its abdomen and flaring out its ribs to turn its body into a "pseudo concave wing", all the while making a continual serpentine motion of lateral undulation parallel to the ground to stabilise its direction in mid-air in order to land safely. Flying snakes are able to glide better than flying squirrels and other gliding animals, despite the lack of limbs, wings, or any other wing-like projections, gliding through the forest and jungle it inhabits with the distance being as great as 100 m. Their destination is mostly predicted by ballistics; however, they can exercise some in-flight attitude control by "slithering" in the air.

Flying lizards of the genus Draco are capable of gliding flight via membranes that may be extended to create wings (patagia), formed by an enlarged set of ribs.

Gliding flight has evolved independently among 3,400 species of frogs from both New World (Hylidae) and Old World (Rhacophoridae) families. This parallel evolution is seen as an adaptation to their life in trees, high above the ground. Characteristics of the Old World species include "enlarged hands and feet, full webbing between all fingers and toes, lateral skin flaps on the arms and legs

== Forces ==
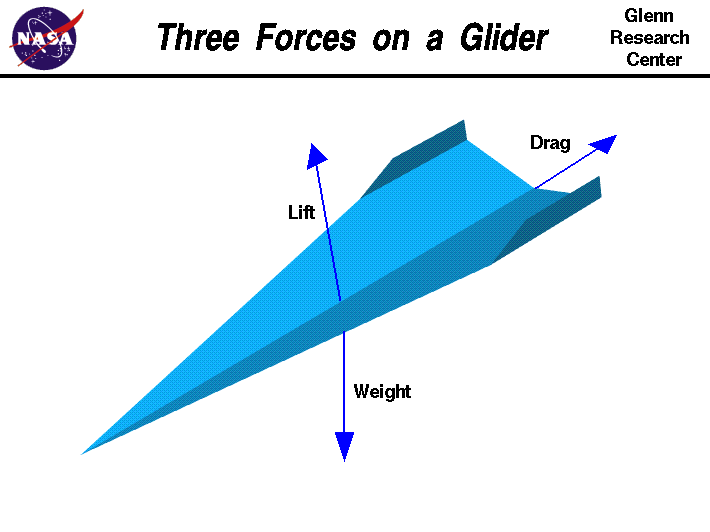
Forces on a gliding animal or aircraft in flight

Three principal forces act on aircraft and animals when gliding:

- weight – gravity acts in the downwards direction
- lift – acts perpendicularly to the vector representing airspeed
- drag – acts parallel to the vector representing the airspeed

As the aircraft or animal descends, the air moving over the wings and body generates lift perpendicular to the motion and drag parallel to the motion. Because the glider is descending as it moves forwards, the weight vector has a forward component that can balance the drag, allowing the speed to remain constant. The energy for overcoming the drag comes from the loss of gravitational potential energy.

Even though the weight causes the glider to descend, if the air is rising faster than the sink rate, there will be a gain of altitude.

== Lift to drag ratio ==
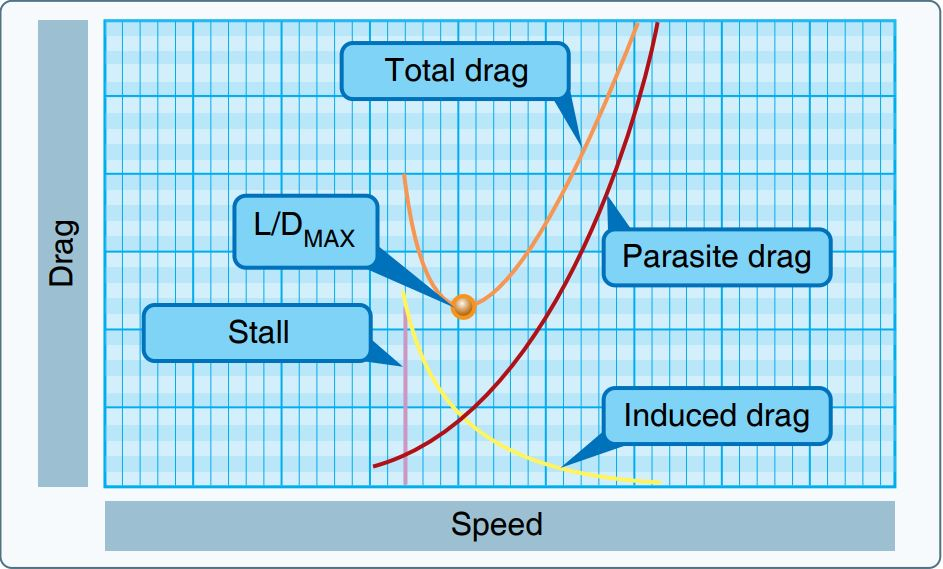
Drag vs Speed. L/DMAX occurs at minimum Total Drag (e.g. Parasite plus Induced)

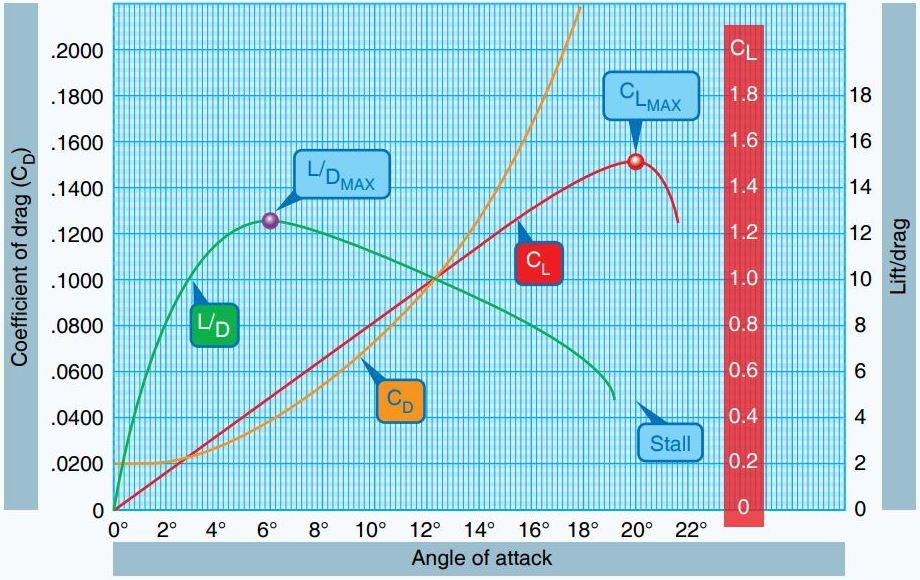
Coefficients of Drag and Lift vs Angle of Attack. Stall speed corresponds to the Angle of Attack at the Maximum Coefficient of Lift

The lift-to-drag ratio, or L/D ratio, is the amount of lift generated by a wing or vehicle, divided by the drag it creates by moving through the air. A higher L/D ratio leads to a better glide slope angle, or glide ratio.

The effect of airspeed on the rate of descent can be depicted by a polar curve. These curves show the airspeed where minimum sink can be achieved and the airspeed with the best L/D ratio. The curve is an inverted U-shape. As speeds reduce the amount of lift falls rapidly around the stalling speed. The peak of the 'U' is at minimum drag.

As lift and drag are both proportional to the coefficient of Lift and Drag respectively multiplied by the same factor (1/2 ρ_{air} v^{2}S), the L/D ratio can be simplified to the Coefficient of lift divided by the coefficient of drag or Cl/Cd, and since both are proportional to the airspeed, the ratio of L/D or Cl/Cd is then typically plotted against angle of attack.

== Drag ==
Induced drag is caused by the generation of lift by the wing. At low speeds an aircraft has to generate lift with a higher angle of attack, leading to greater induced drag. This term dominates the low-speed side of the drag graph, the left side of the U.

Parasitic drag is the drag unrelated to creating the lift, and is caused by skin friction and the shape of the body and wing. This drag is more pronounced at higher speeds, forming the right side of the drag graph's U shape. Profile drag is lowered primarily by reducing cross section and streamlining.

As lift increases steadily until the critical angle, it is normally the point where the combined drag is at its lowest, that the wing or aircraft is performing at its best L/D.

Designers will typically select a wing design which produces an L/D peak at the chosen cruising speed for a powered fixed-wing aircraft, thereby maximizing economy. Like all things in aeronautical engineering, the lift-to-drag ratio is not the only consideration for wing design. Performance at high angle of attack and a gentle stall are also important.

Minimising drag is of particular interest in the design and operation of high performance gliders (sailplanes), the largest of which can have glide ratios approaching 60 to 1, though many others have a lower performance; 25:1 being considered adequate for training use.

== Glide ratio ==
When flown at a constant speed in still air a glider moves forwards a certain distance for a certain distance downwards. The ratio of the distance forwards to downwards is called the glide ratio. The glide ratio (E) is numerically equal to the lift-to-drag ratio under these conditions; but is not necessarily equal during other manoeuvres, especially if speed is not constant. A glider's glide ratio varies with airspeed, but there is a maximum value which is frequently quoted. Glide ratio usually varies little with vehicle loading; a heavier vehicle glides faster, but nearly maintains its glide ratio.

Glide ratio (or "finesse") is the cotangent of the downward angle, the glide angle (γ). Alternatively it is also the forward speed divided by sink speed (unpowered aircraft):

$${L \over D}={{\Delta s} \over {\Delta h}}={v_{\text{forward}} \over v_{\text{down}}}$$

Glide number (ε) is the reciprocal of glide ratio but sometime it is confused.

== Examples ==
Flight article	Scenario	L/D ratio/ glide ratio
Eta (glider)	Gliding	70
Great frigatebird	Soaring over the ocean	15–22 at typical speeds
Hang glider	Gliding	15
Air Canada Flight 143 (Gimli Glider)	Boeing 767–200 when all engines failed due to fuel exhaustion	~12
British Airways Flight 9	Boeing 747-200B when all engines failed due to volcanic ash	~15
Paraglider	High performance model	11
Helicopter	in autorotation	4
Powered parachute	with a rectangular or elliptical parachute	3.6/5.6
Space Shuttle	unpowered approach from space after re-entry	4.5
Wingsuit	while gliding	3
Hypersonic Technology Vehicle 2	Equilibrium hypersonic gliding estimate	2.6
Northern flying squirrel	Gliding	1.98
Sugar glider (possum)	Gliding	1.82
Space Shuttle	Supersonic	2 (at Mach 2.5)
Space Shuttle	Hypersonic	1.8 (at Mach 5), 1 (over Mach 9)
Apollo CM	Transonic	0.50 (at Mach 1.13)
Apollo CM	Reentry and hypersonic	0.368 avg (prior to 1st peak g), 0.41 (at Mach 6)

== Importance of the glide ratio in gliding flight ==
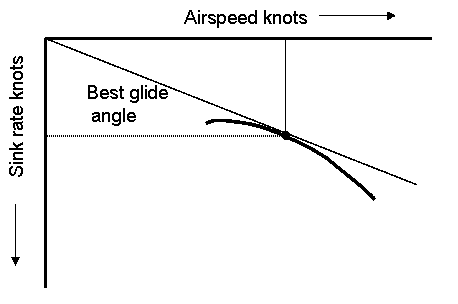
Polar curve showing glide angle for the best glide speed (best L/D). It is the flattest possible glide angle through calm air, which will maximize the distance flown. This airspeed (vertical line) corresponds to the tangent point of a line starting from the origin of the graph. A glider flying faster or slower than this airspeed will cover less distance before landing.

Although the best glide ratio is important when measuring the performance of a gliding aircraft, its glide ratio at a range of speeds also determines its success (see article on gliding).

Pilots sometimes fly at the aircraft's best L/D by precisely controlling airspeed and smoothly operating the controls to reduce drag. However the strength of the likely next lift, minimising the time spent in strongly sinking air and the strength of the wind also affects the optimal speed to fly. Pilots fly faster to get quickly through sinking air, and when heading into wind to optimise the glide angle relative to the ground. To achieve higher speed across country, gliders (sailplanes) are often loaded with water ballast to increase the airspeed and so reach the next area of lift sooner. This has little effect on the glide angle since the increases in the rate of sink and in the airspeed remain in proportion and thus the heavier aircraft achieves optimal L/D at a higher airspeed. If the areas of lift are strong on the day, the benefits of ballast outweigh the slower rate of climb.

If the air is rising faster than the rate of sink, the aircraft will climb. At lower speeds an aircraft may have a worse glide ratio but it will also have a lower rate of sink. A low airspeed also improves its ability to turn tightly in the centre of the rising air where the rate of ascent is greatest. A sink rate of approximately 1.0 m/s is the most that a practical hang glider or paraglider could have before it would limit the occasions that a climb was possible to only when there was strongly rising air. Gliders (sailplanes) have minimum sink rates of between 0.4 and 0.6 m/s depending on the class. Aircraft such as airliners may have a better glide ratio than a hang glider, but would rarely be able to thermal because of their much higher forward speed and their much higher sink rate. (The Boeing 767 in the Gimli Glider incident achieved a glide ratio of only 12:1).

The loss of height can be measured at several speeds and plotted on a "polar curve" to calculate the best speed to fly in various conditions, such as when flying into wind or when in sinking air. Other polar curves can be measured after loading the glider with water ballast. As mass increases, the best glide ratio is achieved at higher speeds (The glide ratio is not increased).

== Soaring ==
Soaring animals and aircraft may alternate glides with periods of soaring in rising air. Five principal types of lift are used: thermals, ridge lift, lee waves, convergences and dynamic soaring. Dynamic soaring is used predominately by birds, and some model aircraft, though it has also been achieved on rare occasions by piloted aircraft.

Examples of soaring flight by birds are the use of:

- Thermals and convergences by raptors such as vultures
- Ridge lift by gulls near cliffs
- Wave lift by migrating birds
- Dynamic effects near the surface of the sea by albatrosses

For humans, soaring is the basis for three air sports: gliding, hang gliding and paragliding.

== See also ==
- Powered hang glider – Foot-launched powered hang glider
- Gliding competition – Competitions in the sport of gliding
- List of airline flights that required gliding
- Underwater glider – Type of autonomous underwater vehicle
