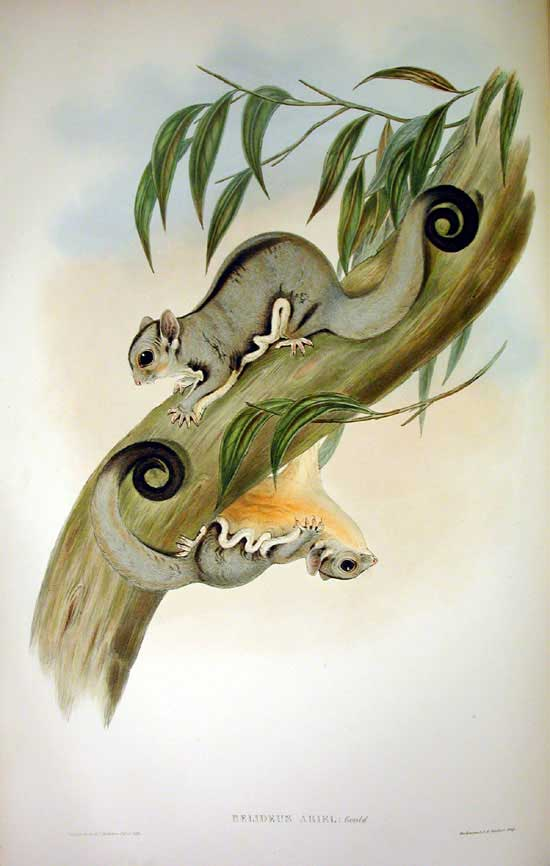
- Illustration by John Gould

Scientific classification
- Kingdom: Animalia
- Phylum: Chordata
- Class: Mammalia
- Infraclass: Marsupialia
- Order: Diprotodontia
- Family: Petauridae
- Genus: Petaurus
- Species: P. ariel

Binomial name
- Petaurus ariel (Gould, 1842)

= Savanna glider =

Species of Australian marsupial

The savanna glider (Petaurus ariel) is a species of arboreal gliding possum in the genus Petaurus.

== Taxonomy ==
It was long considered a subspecies of the sugar glider (P. breviceps), but a 2020 study split P. breviceps into 3 distinct species, with P. ariel being found to represent one of these distinct species.

== Names ==
The Bininj of western Arnhem Land, Australia call this animal lambalk in their Kunwinjku language.

== Description ==
The species somewhat resembles a small squirrel glider (P. norfolcensis) with a pointed nose. It displays substantial body size variation throughout its range; in the northern, more coastal portions, it is small enough to be considered the smallest of all Australian Petaurus. However, in the arid inland parts of its range to the south, it can grow to be twice as large.

== Distribution ==
The species lives in the wooded savannas of northern Australia. It ranges from northwestern Queensland west through the Northern Territory (including most of the Cobourg Peninsula) to northern Western Australia.

== Reproduction ==
In Arnhem Land, breeding is not seasonally restricted and young may be born throughout the year.

== Threats ==
The species is threatened by heavy declines that have been reported to have affected many other small, tree-dwelling mammal species in northern Australia. One study found that the species has undergone a 35% range reduction over the past 3 decades, and is disappearing from inland areas. These declines are thought to be linked to feral cats, changed fire regimes, and feral herbivores. Another study of the Northern Territory populations found a 32% reduction in the species’ extent of occurrence and a 42% reduction in the breadth of occupied environmental space, with a significant contraction towards areas of lower fire frequency.
