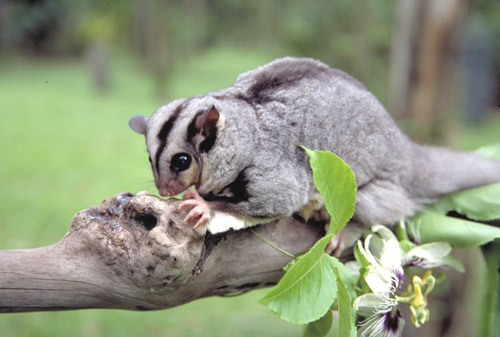

Conservation status
- Endangered (IUCN 3.1)

Scientific classification
- Kingdom: Animalia
- Phylum: Chordata
- Class: Mammalia
- Infraclass: Marsupialia
- Order: Diprotodontia
- Family: Petauridae
- Genus: Petaurus
- Species: P. gracilis

Binomial name
- Petaurus gracilis (de Vis, 1883)
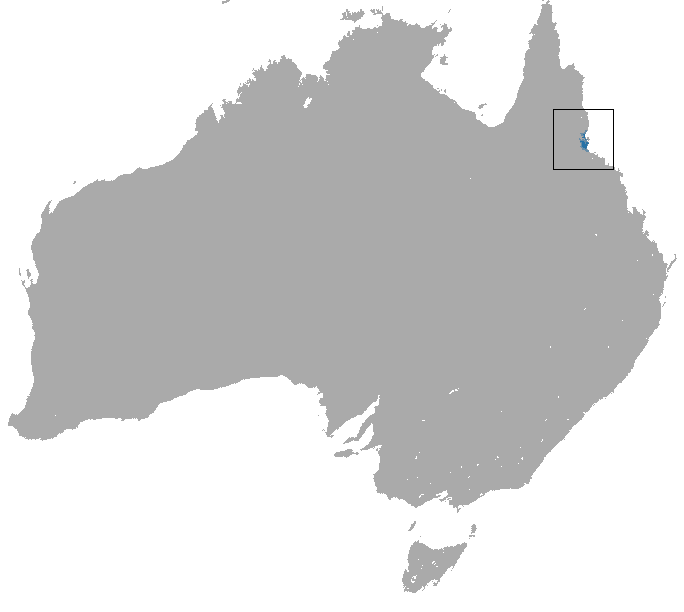
- Mahogany glider range

= Mahogany glider =

Species of marsupial

The mahogany glider (Petaurus gracilis) is an endangered gliding possum native to a small region of coastal Queensland in Australia.

== Appearance ==
A nocturnal arboreal marsupial, the mahogany glider closely resembles the sugar glider, the squirrel glider and the yellow-bellied glider, but is noticeably larger than any of its relatives (26.5 cm long and 410 g) and has a long tail (34–40 cm). The species gets its common name from its mahogany-brown belly and the similar colour of its patagium, or gliding membrane. The tail is covered in short hair, and is black on the underside.

These gliders are sexually dimorphic, with the males being larger than the females, although the latter usually have a longer tail in proportion to their body. In terms of their body length, females are marginally smaller, measuring 23 to 27 centimetres (9.1 to 10.6 in) compared with the male body length of 23 to 28 centimetres (9.1 to 11.0 in), but they have a slightly longer tail, measuring 35 to 41 centimetres (14 to 16 in) compared with 34 to 41 centimetres (13 to 16 in) in males. However, despite their similar apparent size, the females, at 310 to 454 grams (10.9 to 16.0 oz), are much more lightly built than the males, which weigh between 345 and 500 grams (12.2 and 17.6 oz).

== Distribution and habitat ==
The mahogany glider is restricted to a very small area, between Ollera Creek south of Ingham and Tully in North Queensland, Australia. The habitat consists mainly of open forest with many different flowering plants that provide year-round food.

== Reproduction ==
The mahogany glider has a long breeding season with births starting April and ending in October. Litters consist of one or two young, and are usually born once a year, although a mother can give birth to a second litter if the first is lost before leaving the pouch. The young are weaned at four to five months, and reach sexual maturity at twelve to eighteen months. They have been recorded to live to about five or six years of age.

Each pair of adults shares some of their dens with offspring from the previous breeding season. These dens are marked and defended from other mahogany gliders. The pairs are usually monogamous, although extra-pair matings have been observed.

== Behaviour and diet ==
The mahogany glider eats eucalypt sap and gum, acacia sap and seeds, grass tree sap, pollen, nectar, insects, mistletoe, honeydew, wattle exudates, and at least twenty different tree and shrub species.

It is nocturnal, with adults living together in monogamous pairs. In ideal conditions, the combined home range of a pair of animals averages around 23 hectares (57 acres), although this may be smaller in areas of fragmented habitat. Animals travel a considerable distance each night, with 1.5 kilometres (0.93 mi) being typical; they are generally more mobile in the wet season than in the height of the dry season. During the day, mahogany gliders den in high trees, with poplar gums and forest red gums being especially favoured. Although they are socially monogamous, they do not usually share dens, with each individual having from three to nine dens within its home range.

In January the time spent outside of the den for travelling and feeding is around 40%, while in September the amount was 77%. This activity was spent mostly at night ranging in a continuous period of 8–10 hours outside.

Mahogany gliders have been reported to make deep, nasal grunting sounds when travelling at night, and a similar, but much louder and more rapid, alarm call, which has been described as "reminiscent of a lawnmower". Predators include Australian scrub python, owls, and, in some instances, feral cats.

== Conservation ==
Mahogany gliders are listed as a threatened species. First discovered in 1886 by a collector from the Queensland Museum the species was lost to science for over a hundred years until it was rediscovered in 1989 and finally identified as a different species.

In 2000, Queensland Parks and Wildlife Service enacted a recovery programme for the mahogany glider. The Wildlife Preservation Society of Queensland also had a recovery programme for the preservation of gliders, including the mahogany glider.

The main threat to mahogany gliders is habitat loss due to clearing for development, forestry and agriculture. Over 80% of their habitat has been destroyed leaving pockets of isolated populations. Scientists at James Cook University are researching the genetic health of the species and working with partners to determine whether the species is present on Hinchinbrook Island off the coast.

Mahogany gliders can be seen in captivity at David Fleay Wildlife Park and Cairns Tropical Zoo, both of which participate in breeding programmes for the mahogany glider.

== Bibliography ==
- Booth, R., Ensabella, T.-J. & Jackson, S.M. (2019). Growth and development of the Mahogany Glider Petaurus gracilis. Zoo Biology 38: 266-271.
- Jackson, S.M. (1999). Preliminary predictions of the impacts of habitat area and catastrophes on the viability of mahogany glider Petaurus gracilis populations. Pacific Conservation Biology 5: 56-62.
- Jackson, S.M. & Claridge, A. (1999). Climatic modelling of the distribution of the mahogany glider Petaurus gracilis and squirrel glider Petaurus norfolcensis, with implications for their evolutionary history. Australian Journal of Zoology 47: 47-57.
- Jackson, S.M. (2000). Population dynamics and life history of the mahogany glider Petaurus gracilis and sugar glider Petaurus breviceps in North Queensland. Wildlife Research 27: 21-37.
- Jackson, S.M. (2000). Habitat relationships of the mahogany glider Petaurus gracilis and the sugar glider Petaurus breviceps. Wildlife Research 27: 39-48.
- Jackson, S.J. (2000). Home range and den use of the Mahogany Glider (Petaurus gracilis). Wildlife Research 27: 49–60.
- Jackson, S.M. (2000). Glide angle in the genus Petaurus and a review of gliding in mammals. Mammal Review 30: 9-30.
- Jackson, S.M. (2001) Foraging behaviour and food availability of the mahogany glider Petaurus gracilis (Petauridae: Marsupialia). Journal of Zoology (London) 253: 1-13.
- Jackson, S.M. & Johnson, C.N. (2002) Time allocation to foraging in the mahogany glider Petaurus gracilis (Marsupialia, Petauridae) and a comparison of activity times in exudivorous and folivorous possums and gliders. Journal of Zoology (London) 256: 271-277.
- Jackson, S.M. (2011). Petaurus gracilis (Diprotodontia: Petauridae). Mammalian Species 43: 141-148.
- Jackson, S.M., Morgan, G., Kemp, J.E., Maughan, M. & Stafford, C.M. (2011). An accurate assessment of habitat loss and current threats to the mahogany glider (Petaurus gracilis). Australian Mammalogy 33: 82-92.
- Jackson, S.M. & Thorington, R. (2012). Gliding mammals: Taxonomy of living and extinct species. Smithsonian Contributions to Zoology 638: 1-117.
- Jackson, S.M., Parsons, M., Baseler, M. & Stanton, D. (2020). Landscape management of the mahogany glider (Petaurus gracilis) across its distribution: Subpopulations and corridor priorities. Australian Mammalogy 42: 152–159.
- Van Dyck, S. (1993). The taxonomy and distribution of Petaurus gracilis (Marsupialia: Petauridae), with notes on its ecology and distribution status, Mem. Queensland Museum 33: 77–122
- Van Dyck, S. (1995). Mahogany Glider Petaurus gracilis. pp. 232–233 in Strahan, R. (ed.) The Mammals of Australia. The National Photographic Index of Australian Wildlife. Sydney: Reed New Holland 2nd Edition 756 pp.
