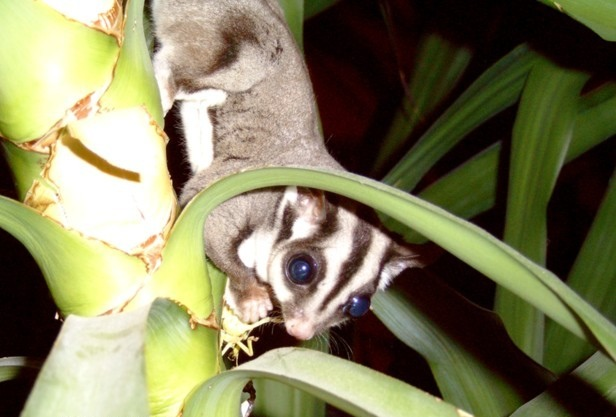
- Sugar glider

Scientific classification
- Kingdom: Animalia
- Phylum: Chordata
- Class: Mammalia
- Infraclass: Marsupialia
- Order: Diprotodontia
- Family: Petauridae
- Genus: Petaurus; Shaw, 1791

Type species
- Petaurus australis Shaw, 1791

Species
- Petaurus abidi; Petaurus ariel; Petaurus australis; Petaurus biacensis; Petaurus breviceps; Petaurus gracilis; Petaurus norfolcensis; Petaurus notatus
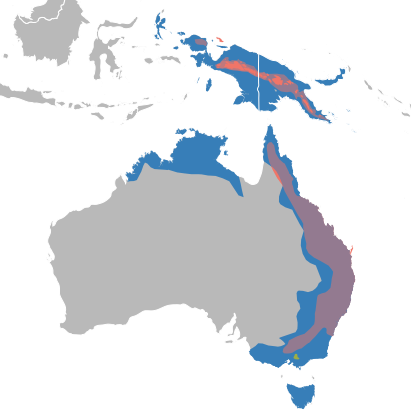
- Distribution rangemap of Petauridae species. Petaurus in blue (mixed with orange where Dactylopsila also present).

= Petaurus =

Genus of marsupials

The genus Petaurus (/pə.tɔːˈrəs/) contains flying phalangers or wrist-winged gliders, a group of arboreal possums native to Australia, New Guinea, and surrounding islands. There are eight species: the sugar glider, savanna glider, Krefft's glider, squirrel glider, mahogany glider, northern glider, yellow-bellied glider and Biak glider.

Flying phalangers are typically nocturnal, most being small (sometimes around 400 mm (16 in), counting the tail), and have folds of loose skin (patagia) running from the wrists to the ankles. They use the patagia to glide from tree to tree by jumping and holding out their limbs spread-eagle. They are able to glide for distances over 140 metres (460 ft). Beside the distinctive skin folds, flying phalangers also have large, forward-facing eyes, short (though pointed) faces, and long flat tails which are used as rudders while gliding.

All are omnivores, and eat tree sap, gum, nectar, pollen, and insects, along with manna and honeydew. Most flying phalangers appear to be solitary, though the yellow-bellied glider and sugar glider are both known to live in groups.

== Conservation status ==
While Biak and Krefft's gliders are relatively common, most of the other species are rare. The mahogany glider is the most threatened species in Australia and is listed as endangered. They are so uncommon that they were not seen for more than a hundred years after their original discovery in 1883. Nearly a month after they were rediscovered in 1989, their habitat was cleared for plantations, and another population was not found until 1991. The reasons for the endangered status of the mahogany glider include habitat degradation or loss, limited distribution, and the lack of habitat protection. Along with mahogany gliders, the squirrel gliders (Petaurus norfolcensis) are also somewhat threatened as well. A 2020 study found that the true sugar glider (P. breviceps) also has a restricted range in Australia, making it far more threatened than initially thought.

== Species ==
- Genus Petaurus
  - Northern glider, Petaurus abidi
  - Savanna glider, Petaurus ariel
  - Yellow-bellied glider, Petaurus australis
  - Biak glider, Petaurus biacensis
  - Sugar glider, Petaurus breviceps
  - Mahogany glider, Petaurus gracilis
  - Squirrel glider, Petaurus norfolcensis
  - Krefft's glider, Petaurus notatus
