= Biak glider =

Conservation status
- Least Concern (IUCN 3.1)

Scientific classification
- Kingdom: Animalia
- Phylum: Chordata
- Class: Mammalia
- Infraclass: Marsupialia
- Order: Diprotodontia
- Family: Petauridae
- Genus: Petaurus
- Species: P. biacensis

Binomial name
- Petaurus biacensis Ulmer, 1940
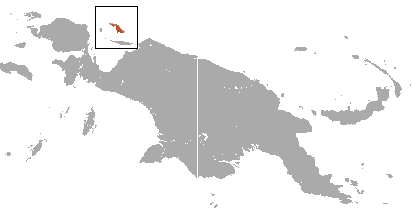
- range

Species of marsupial

The Biak glider (Petaurus biacensis) is a species of marsupial in the family Petauridae. It is endemic to the Schouten Islands in the western region of Papua Province, Indonesia. It was formerly considered to be a subspecies of Petaurus breviceps (sugar glider); there is still uncertainty regarding its status as a distinct species.

The Biak glider ranges in length from 130–150 mm (5.1–5.9 in) and in weight from 79–100 g (2.8–3.5 oz).

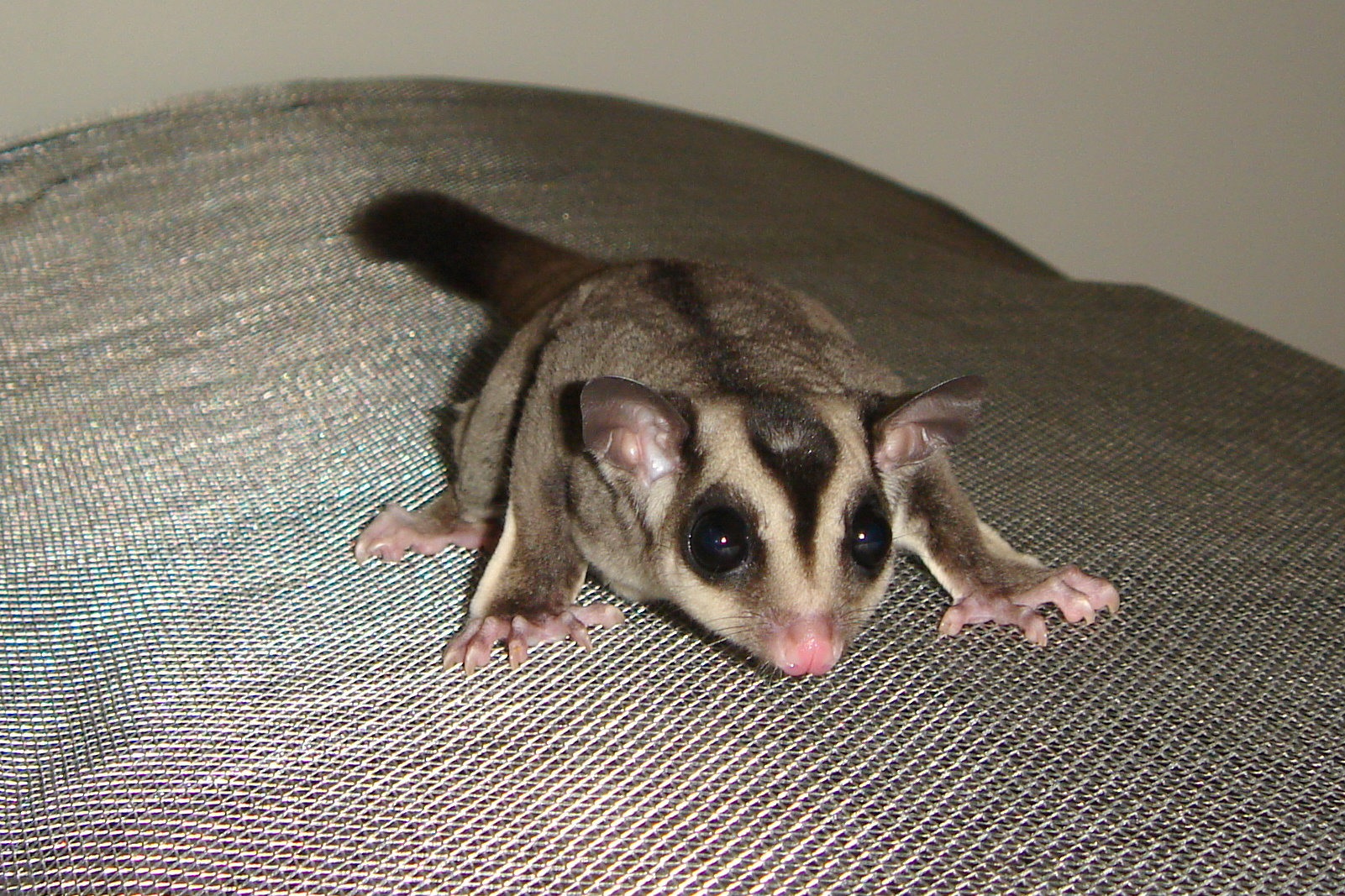
Petaurus breviceps, the Sugar glider, of which the Biak glider is closet morphologically.

== Distribution ==
Biak, Supiori and Owi isles.
