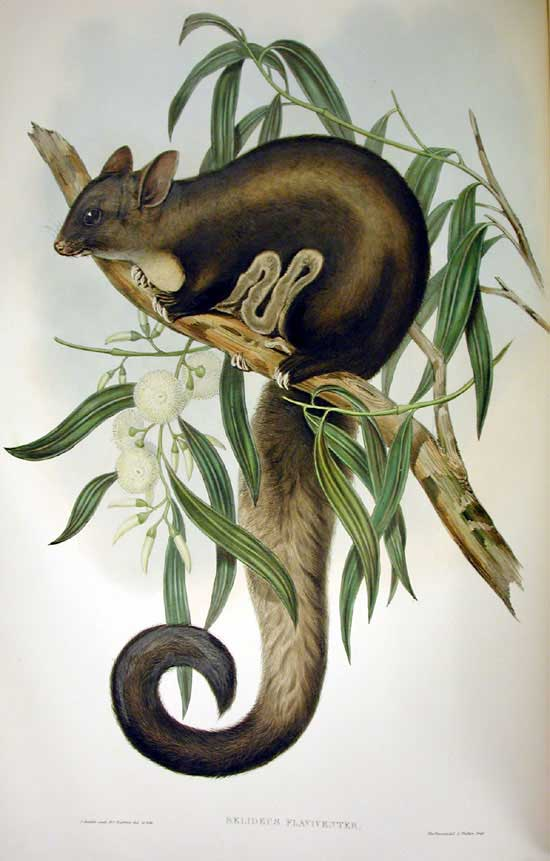

Conservation status
- Vulnerable (IUCN 3.1)

Scientific classification
- Kingdom: Animalia
- Phylum: Chordata
- Class: Mammalia
- Infraclass: Marsupialia
- Order: Diprotodontia
- Family: Petauridae
- Genus: Petaurus
- Species: P. australis

Binomial name
- Petaurus australis Shaw, 1791
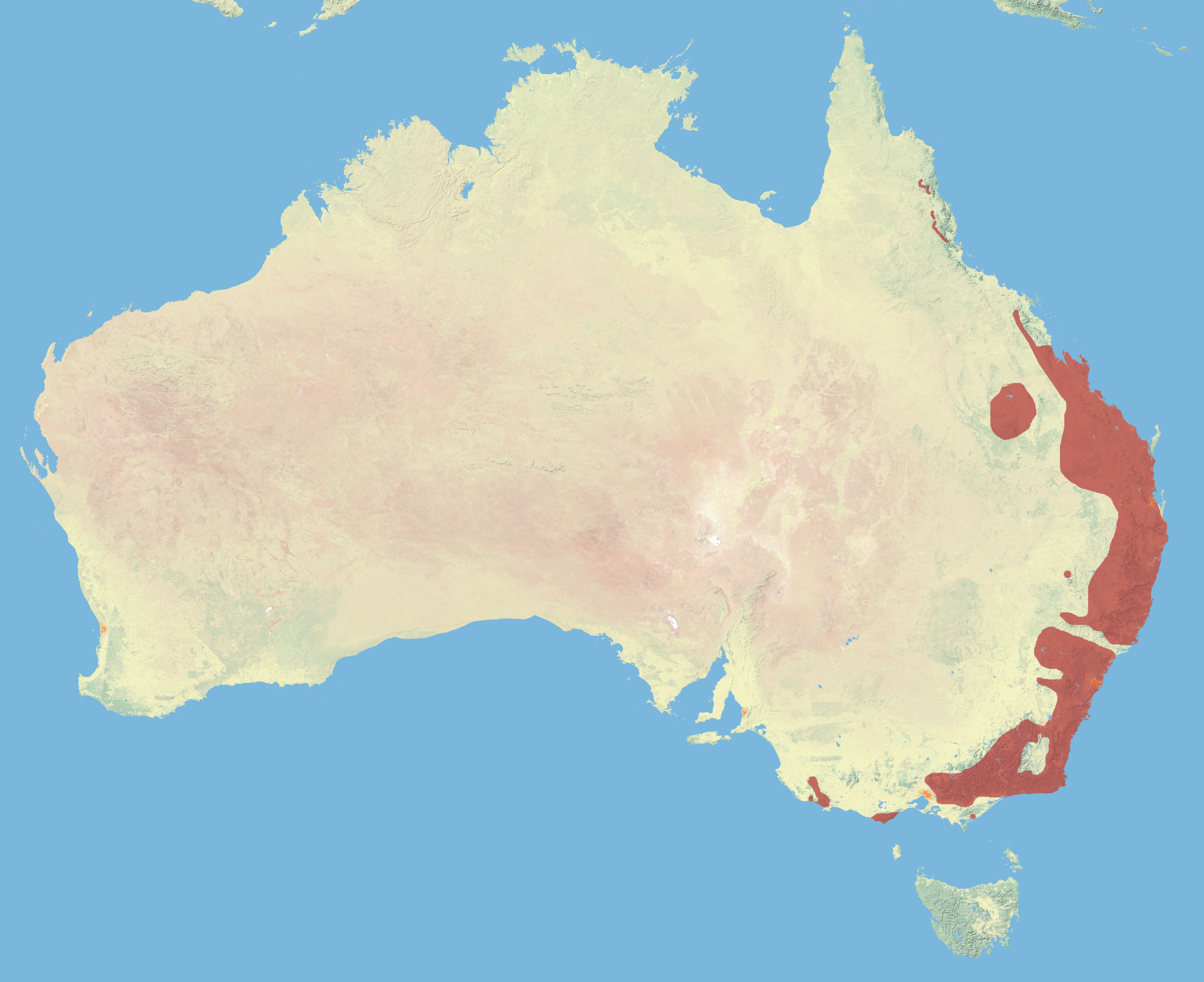
- Distribution, within Australia

= Yellow-bellied glider =

Species of marsupial

The yellow-bellied glider (Petaurus australis), also known as the fluffy glider, is an arboreal and nocturnal gliding possum that lives in native eucalypt forests in eastern Australia, from northern Queensland south to Victoria.

== Habitat ==
The yellow-bellied glider inhabits forests and woodlands in eastern Australia and is found at a range of altitudes from sea level to 1,400 m (4,600 ft).

In North Queensland, the sub-species occurs at altitudes over 700 m (2,300 ft) above sea level. With natural discontinuities and habitat clearings, there are 13 different populations in three distinct places to find this glider in North Queensland. One population resides on Mount Windsor Tableland, another on Mount Carbine Tableland, and the third lives in a linear habitat going from Atherton to Kirrama on the Atherton Tableland. These three populations together are estimated to contain around 6000 individual gliders. With their habitat in danger, the yellow-bellied glider is classified as uncommon to rare and is named vulnerable to the tropics. This species is more widespread in southern Queensland, NSW and Victoria.

== Appearance and behaviour ==
The yellow-bellied glider is a marsupial about the size of a rabbit. It typically has grey-brown fur on its back and has an off-white to orange or yellow belly. It has large pointed ears and a long tail that can grow to reach 48 cm (19 in) in length. Its body length is smaller reaching to about 30 cm long and the marsupial weighs a total of 700 g. The males are usually bigger than the females.

There are two subspecies:

- P. a. australis in the south (which is locally common)
- P. a. reginae in northern Queensland (which is rare and threatened with logging)

The yellow-bellied glider is the largest species of Petaurus, the wrist-winged gliders, a group of arboreal marsupials, and can glide up to 150 m (490 ft). The yellow-bellied glider has been observed to jump up to 100 m (330 ft) or 114 m (374 ft).

It is similar in appearance to the mahogany glider, although slightly larger in size. It is also similar in appearance to the greater glider, a species that is more closely related to the lemur-like ringtail possum than to the other members of the genus Petaurus.

The yellow-bellied glider is gregarious and spends the day in a leaf-lined tree hole, which is usually shared with other members of the same family. It is also one of the most vocal possum gliders. It has a distinctive growling call that it uses as means of communication. It has been recorded to have been heard up to 500 m (1,600 ft) away.

A recording of the distinctive call can be heard online.

== Reproduction ==
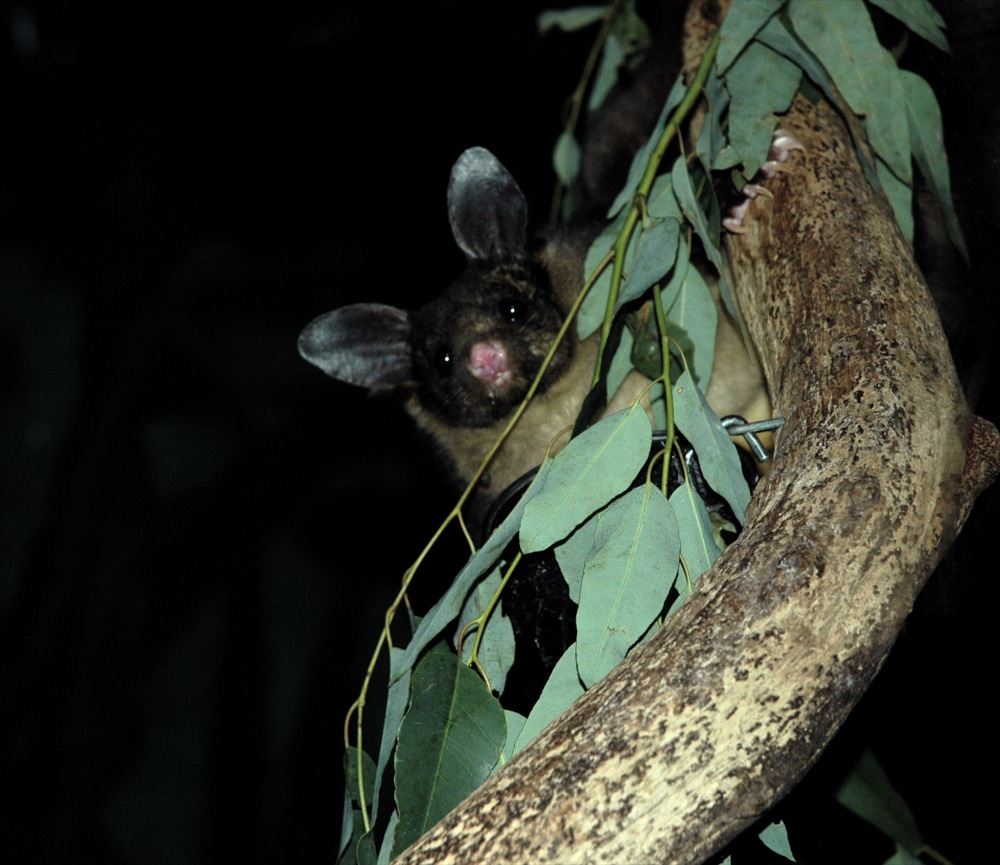
Yellow-bellied Glider

Breeding occurs in spring in the south, but throughout the year in Queensland in the north. Sexual maturity for the glider is around two years of age when the glider will then pair up with another glider, usually in a monogamous relationship and mate August to December. The offspring are normally born between May and September. They then stay in the marsupium for about 100 days. The young are then left in the den for 2–3 months before they are weaned from the mother and go off on their own. While in the dens both parents will care for the offspring.

In North Queensland the dens are made in Eucalyptus grandis trees and are lined with leaves. Their total life expectancy is about six years.

== Diet ==
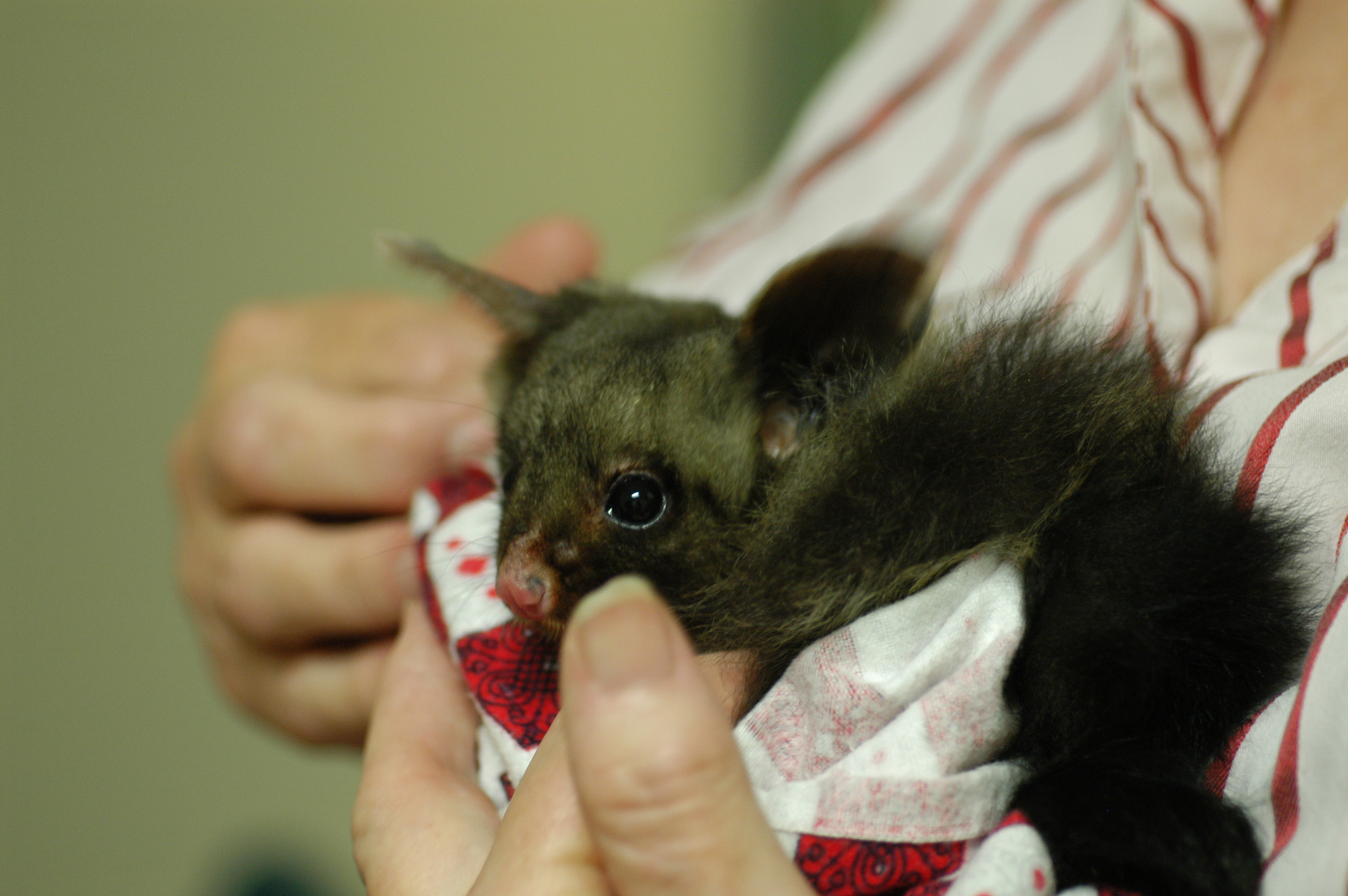
Yellow-bellied glider

The yellow-bellied glider's diet consists of nectar, honeydew, insects, pollen and a wide spread of tree sap including different Eucalyptus sap, Corymbia sap, some Angophora sap, and Lophostemon sap. It shows a strong preference for trees with a smooth bark, possibly relating to the volume of sap flow. It obtains the tree sap by biting a 'V' shape wedge/notch into the bark to promote the flow of gum and sap. It usually incises the bark on the trunks or upper branches of the trees.

== Conservation ==
Habitat loss and fragmentation due to timber-harvesting and agriculture are the main threats to this species. The previous felling of old nest trees together with regular proscribed fire regimes and general timber removal have led to a degradation of the remaining habitats. Previously it had been listed as a species of "Least Concern" because of a wide distribution, including several protected areas. This listing was changed to "Near Threatened" in the 2016 IUCN Red List publication because of a population decrease of 30% over three generations. The listing was then changed to "Vulnerable" in the 2025 IUCN Red List publication because ongoing monitoring programs demonstrated a population decrease of over 30% over three generations.
