= Patagium =

Membranous structure that assists a vertebrate animal in gliding or flight

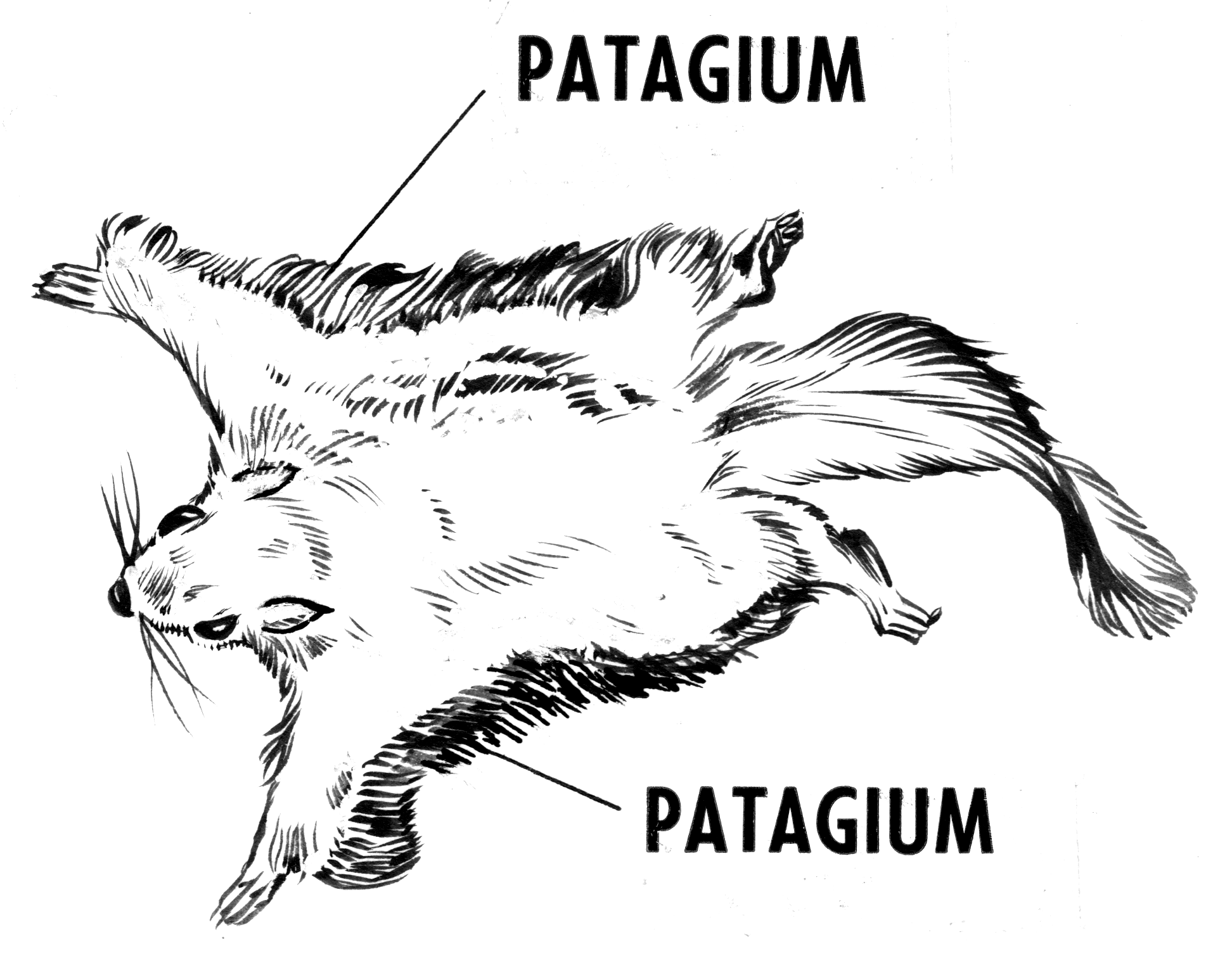
Patagia on a flying squirrel

The patagium (pl.: patagia) is a membranous body part that assists a vertebrate animal in obtaining lift when gliding or flying. The structure is found in extant and extinct groups of flying and gliding animals including bats, theropod dinosaurs (including birds and some dromaeosaurs), pterosaurs, gliding mammals, some flying lizards, and flying frogs. The patagium that stretches between an animal's hind limbs is called the uropatagium (especially in bats) or the interfemoral membrane.

== Bats ==
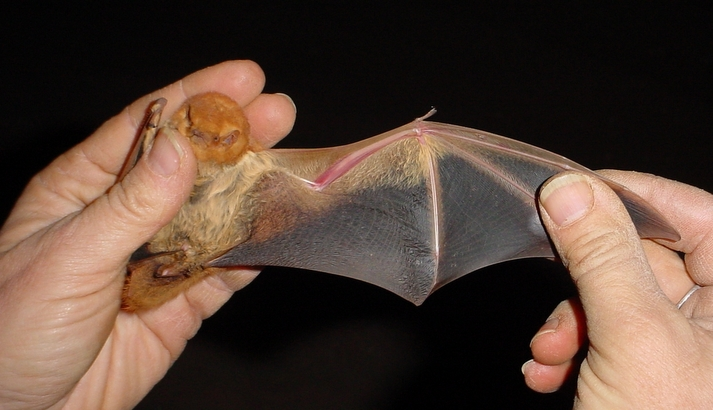
Wing of a desert red bat (Lasiurus frantzii)

In bats, the skin forming the surface of the wing is an extension of the skin of the abdomen that runs to the tip of each digit, uniting the forelimb with the body.

The patagium of a bat has four distinct parts:

1. Propatagium: the patagium present from the neck to the first digit.
2. Dactylopatagium: the portion found within the digits.
3. Plagiopatagium: the portion found between the last digit and the hindlimbs.
4. Uropatagium: the posterior portion of the flap between the two hindlimbs.

== Pterosaurs ==
In the flying pterosaurs, the patagium was composed of the membrane forming the surface of the wing, supported primarily between the body and the elongated fourth finger.

The patagium of a pterosaur had three distinct parts:

1. Propatagium: the anterior-most membrane, extending from the shoulder to the wrist. Pterosaurs developed a unique bone to support this membrane, the pteroid.
2. Brachiopatagium: the main flight surface, stretching from the elongated fourth finger to the hindlimbs.
3. Uropatagium or cruropatagium: the posterior-most membrane occurring between the two hindlimbs.
4. A laser-stimulated fluorescence scan on Pterodactylus also identified a membranous "fairing" (area conjunctioning the wing with the body at the neck), as opposed to the feathered or fur-composed "fairing" seen in birds and bats respectively.

== Gliding mammals ==
Flying squirrels, sugar gliders, colugos, anomalures and other mammals also have patagia that extend between the limbs; as in bats and pterosaurs, they also possess propatagia and uropatagia. Though the forelimb is not as specialised as in true flyers, the membrane tends to be an equally complex organ, composed of various muscle groups and fibers. Various species have styliform bones to support the membranes, either on the elbow (colugos, anomalures, greater glider, Eomys) or on the wrist (flying squirrels).

== Lepidoptera ==
In moths, the patagia are two sclerotized protuberances from the anterior prothorax covered by a discrete group of scales forming the collar (the scales are sometimes referred to as the patagium). In the Watsonidia pardea shown at right, the patagium is cream-colored. Not to be confused with the tegulae, which are sclerites at the bases of the forewings on the mesothorax (here, the scales on the tegulae are cream at the base, with a black bar, and orange towards the posterior). Scaling patterns of the patagium and tegulae often provide valuable taxonomic characters.

== Other ==
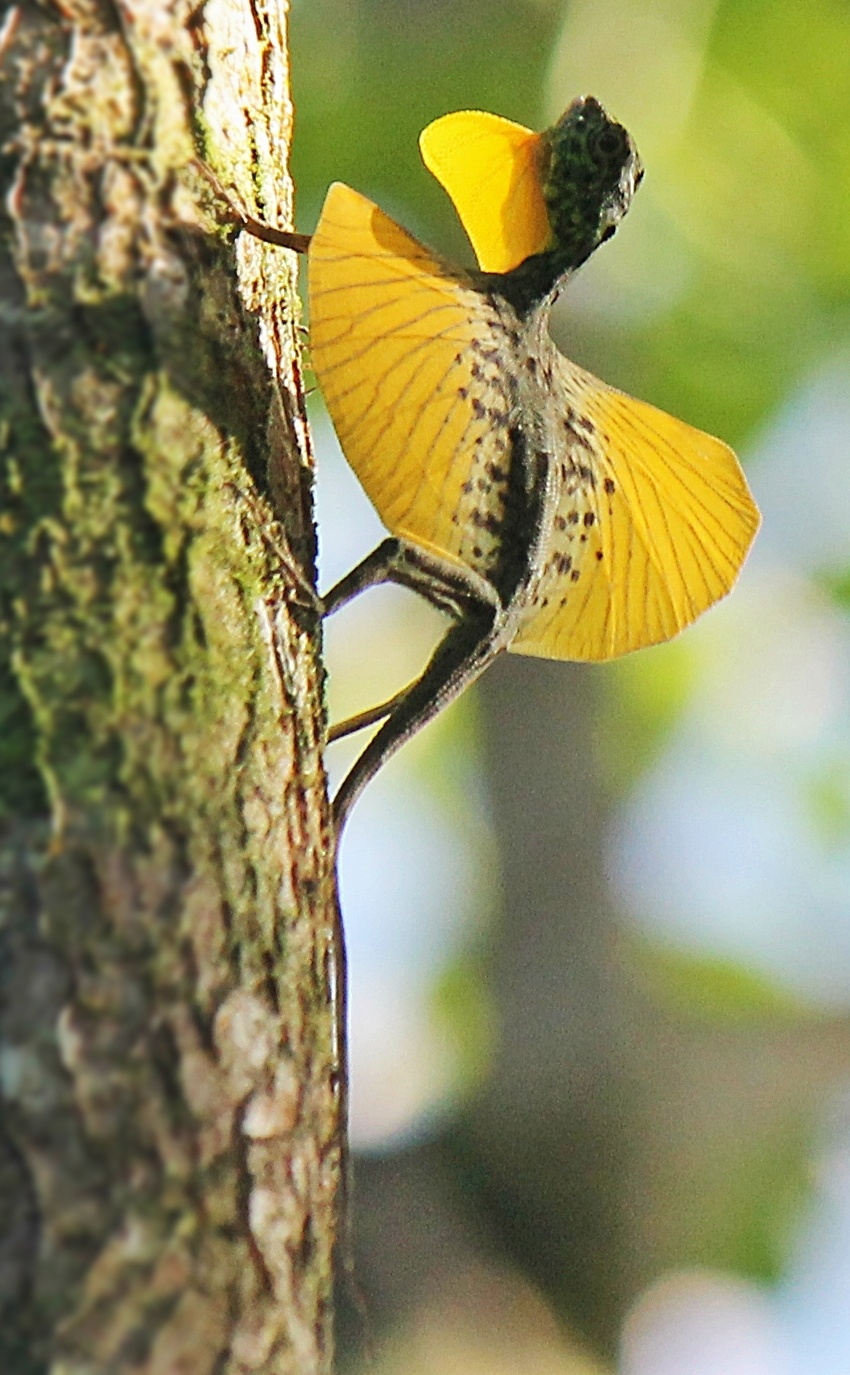
A flying dragon, Draco spilonotus, extending the gular flag (throat flap) and patagia

In gliding species, such as some lizards and flying frogs, the patagium is the flat parachute-like extension of skin that catches the air, which allows gliding flight.

In birds, the propatagium is the elastic fold of skin extending from the shoulder to the carpal joint, making up the leading edge of the inner wing. Many authors use the term "patagium" to describe the fold of skin between the body (behind the shoulder) and the elbow that houses the outer segments of the latissimus dorsi caudalis and triceps scapularis muscles. Similarly the fleshy pad that houses the follicles of the remiges (primary and secondary feathers) caudal to the hand and the ulna is also often referred to as a patagium. The interremigial ligament that connects the bases all the primary and secondary feathers as it passes from the tip of the hand to the elbow is thought to represent the caudal edge of the ancestral form of this patagium.

The scansoriopterygid dinosaurs Yi and Ambopteryx had rather elaborate, superficially bat-like patagia in the forelimbs, unique among dinosaurs. The exact extent is not clear, but they were extensive and supported by a long styliform bone as in gliding mammals. Other scansoriopterygids might have had similar patagia, based on their long third fingers.

The Triassic lizard-like reptile Sharovipteryx had been found with fossilised membranes between its hindlimbs likely used for gliding.

== See also ==
- Volaticotherium – Extinct family of mammals
- Yi (dinosaur) – Extinct genus of dinosaur
- Ambopteryx – Genus of scansoriopterygid dinosaur
- Wingsuit flying – Variant of skydiving that uses jumpsuit with webbed sleeves, which mimic the patagia of flying mammals
