= Lazarus taxon =

Taxon that disappears from the fossil record, only to reappear later

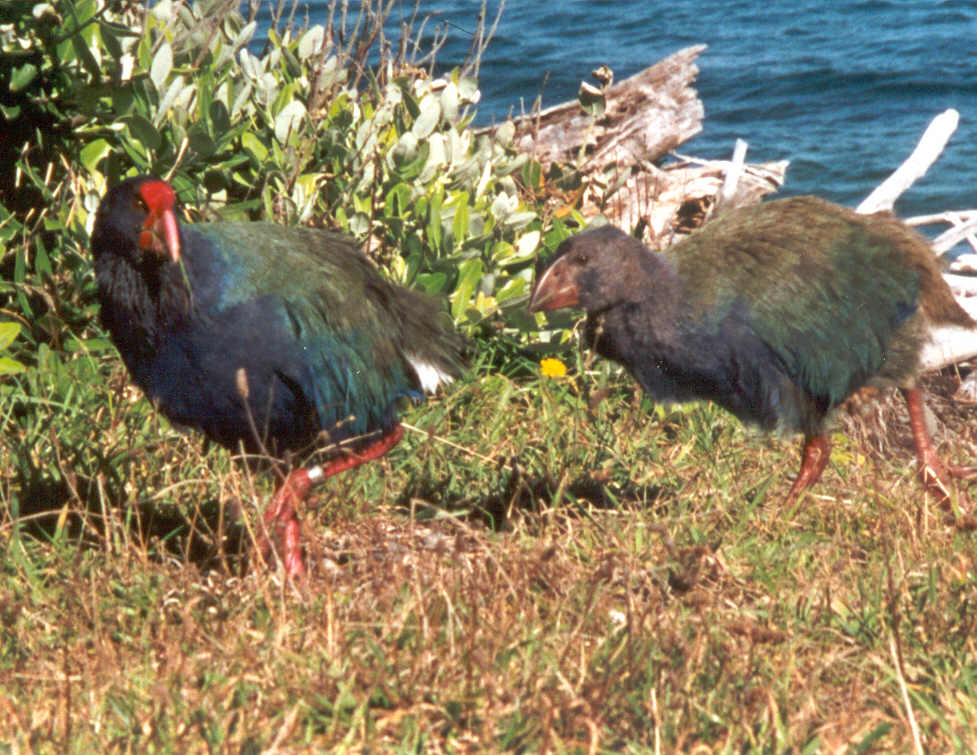
The takahē of New Zealand had not been seen since 1898 before its rediscovery in 1948, making it an example of a Lazarus taxon.

A Lazarus taxon is a taxon that undergoes a period, either in the fossil record or in life, where it goes undetected before being rediscovered. The concept tends to be divided between its paleontological and ecological definitions. In paleontology, it is defined as a taxon which disappears from the fossil record for a time; in ecology, it is defined as a species mistakenly believed extinct before being rediscovered. The term was coined by Karl W. Flessa and David Jablonski in 1983 in reference to the story of Lazarus, who in the Christian biblical tradition was raised from the dead by Jesus.

== Evolution of term ==
The first use of the term was during the extinction symposiums of the summer of 1983, specifically those of the Society for the Study of Evolution in St. Louis and Northern Arizona University in Flagstaff. David Jablonski observed in his speeches during these symposiums that many taxa disappeared from the fossil record before the Permo-Triassic and Cretaceous-Tertiary boundaries but subsequently cropped up again on the other side, and he proposed the term Lazarus effect to describe these phenomena. In his opinion, the Lazarus effect suggested that of the extinctions believed to have occurred within a certain time interval, a significant portion were false impressions created by such artifacts.

Attention was focused on the term by Emmanuel Fara in his 2001 article “What Are Lazarus Taxa?,” where he analyzed the various interpretations of the term that had cropped up since it had been introduced. He especially highlighted that while some considered the Lazarus effect as any temporary disappearance of a taxon from the fossil record, others restricted usage of the term to phenomena associated with mass extinction events.

In 2007, Sid Perkins applied the term to living organisms "rediscovered” after presumed extinction in his article “Back from the dead? Resurrections of long-missing species lead to revelation," using examples such as the coelacanth and Laotian rock rat. In 2014, Erik Meijaard and Vincent Nijman assessed the term in the context of conservation biology. Since then, conservation organizations have increasingly used the term as a motivational impetus for the rediscovery of other species presumed extinct. The phrase is now applied to any taxon that has experienced a gap in human awareness, whether in the fossil record or in life.

== Potential explanations ==
Lazarus taxa are observational artifacts that appear to occur either because of (local) extinction, later resupplied, or as a sampling artifact. The fossil record is inherently sporadic (only a very small fraction of organisms become fossilized, and an even smaller fraction are discovered before destruction) and contains gaps not necessarily caused by extinction, particularly when the number of individuals in a taxon is very low.

After mass extinctions, such as the Permian–Triassic extinction event, the Lazarus effect occurred for many taxa. However, there appears to be no link with the abundance of fossiliferous sites and the proportion of Lazarus taxa, and no missing taxa have been found in potential refuges. Therefore, reappearance of Lazarus taxa probably reflects the rebound after a period of extreme rarity during the aftermath of such extinctions.

== Related but distinct concepts ==
Lazarus taxa and other ghost lineages reflect the sporadic nature of the fossil record.

An Elvis taxon is a look-alike that has supplanted an extinct taxon through convergent evolution.

A zombie taxon is a taxon that contains specimens that have been collected from strata younger than the extinction of the taxon. Later such fossils turn out to be freed from the original seam and refossilized in a younger sediment. For example, a trilobite that gets eroded out of its Cambrian-aged limestone matrix, and reworked into Miocene-aged siltstone.

A ghost lineage is a pronounced gap in time for the fossil record of a group, indicating that the group continued evolving throughout the gap, without direct fossil evidence from within the gap. Lazarus taxa are a type of ghost lineage where extinction was originally assumed to occur within the gap, only for younger fossils or surviving members of the group to indicate otherwise.

A living fossil is an extant taxon that appears to have changed so little compared with fossil remains, that it is considered identical. Living fossils may occur regularly in the fossil record, such as the lampshell Lingula, though the living species in this genus are not identical to fossil brachiopods.

Other living fossils however are also Lazarus taxa if these have been missing from the fossil record for substantial periods of time, such as applies for coelacanths.

In paleovirology, divergent clades of genomic elements from presumably extinct viruses are often known only from host genomes. However, in some cases extant viruses have later been associated with these "fossil" elements, indicating Lazarus-like taxa. For example, a clade of paleoviruses from presumed extinct filoviruses found in shrews was later found to contain an extant filovirus (Tapajós virus, TAPV).

Finally, the term "Lazarus species" is applied to organisms that have been rediscovered as being still alive after having been widely considered extinct for years, without ever having appeared in the fossil record. In this last case, the term Lazarus taxon is applied in neontology.

== Discussions ==
Because its definition is ambiguous, some, like R. B. Rickards and A. J. Wright, reject the very concept of the Lazarus taxon. Rickards and Wright have questioned the usefulness of the concept, writing in "Lazarus taxa, refugia and relict faunas: evidence from graptolites" that anyone could argue that any gap in the fossil record could potentially be considered a Lazarus effect because the duration required for the Lazarus effect is not defined. They have argued that accurate plotting of biodiversity changes and species abundance through time, coupled with an appraisal of their palaeobiogeography, is more important than using this title to categorize species.

== Communication and education ==
The lack of public engagement around environmental issues has led conservationists to attempt newer communication strategies. One of them is the focus on positive messages, of which Lazarus species are an important part. One conservation outreach project that has focused exclusively on species rediscoveries is the Lost & Found project which aims to tell the stories of species once thought extinct but that were subsequently rediscovered.

== Reappearing fossil taxa ==
=== From Quaternary (2.6 to 0 million years ago) ===
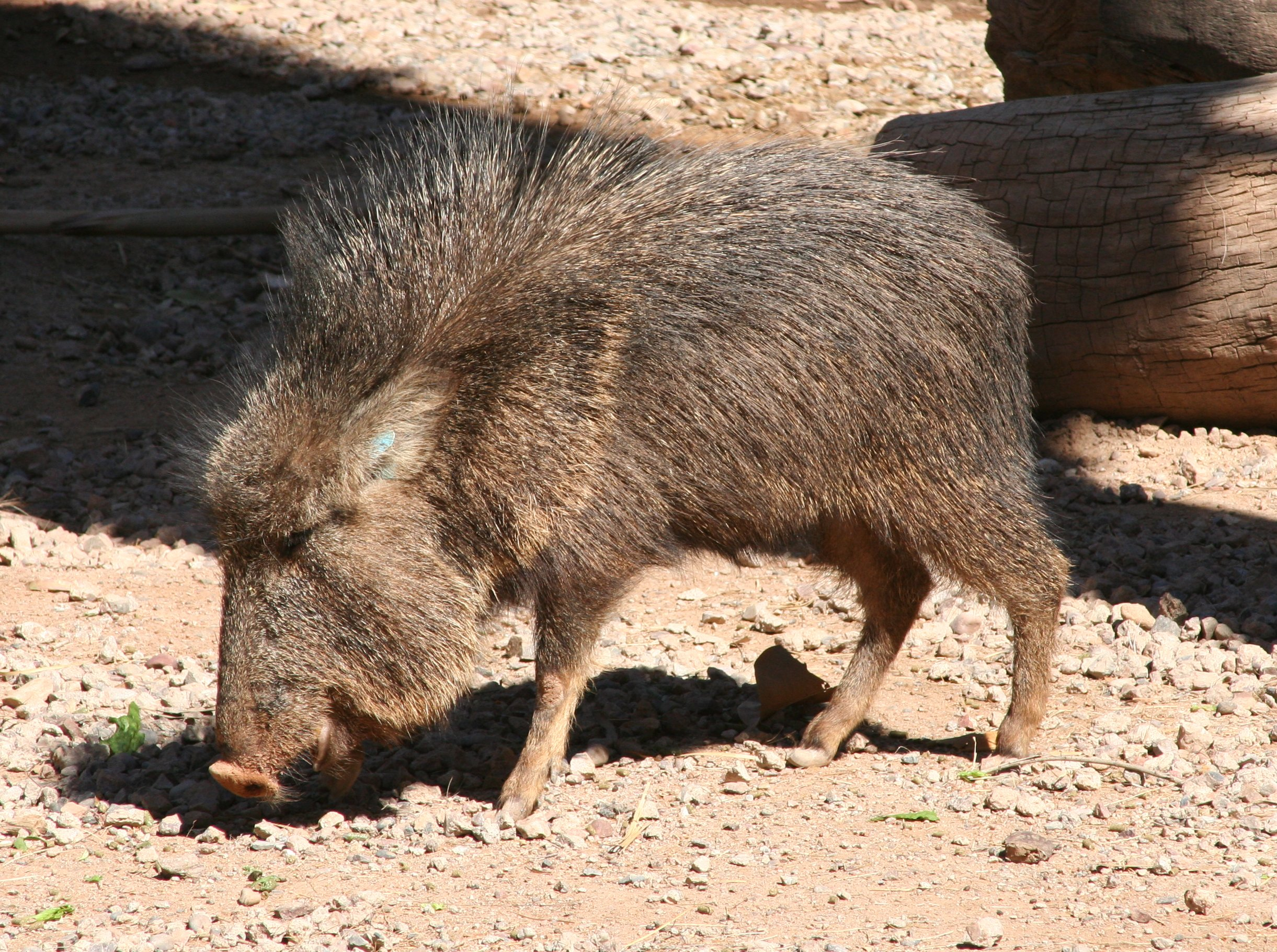
Chacoan peccary

- Two possum species, ring-tailed glider (Tous ayamaruensis) and pygmy long-fingered possum (Dactylonax kambuayai); originally described entirely based on fossils in the 1990s, were rediscovered in 2026 still alive by a collaboration of scientists, indigenous communities, and citizen scientists.
- Bush dog (Speothos venaticus), last surviving species of the genus Speothos; first described as an extinct taxon in 1842 by Peter Wilhelm Lund, based on fossils uncovered from Brazilian caves; Lund found and described living specimens in 1843 without realizing they were of the same species as the fossils, dubbing the living bush dogs as members of the genus "Icticyon"; this was not corrected until some time in the 20th century.
- Chacoan peccary (Catagonus wagneri), last surviving species of the genus Catagonus; believed to be the closest living relative to the extinct genus Platygonus. First described as extinct in 1930 as fossils; live specimens found in 1974.
- False killer whale (Pseudorca crassidens), first described by the British paleontologist and biologist Richard Owen based on a skull discovered in 1843 found in Stamford, Lincolnshire in England and dated to the Middle Pleistocene around 126,000 years ago. The first carcasses washed up on the shores of Kiel Bay in Denmark in 1861; until this point the species was thought to be extinct.
- Bulmer's fruit bat (Aproteles bulmerae), originally described from a Pleistocene garbage pile, it was subsequently discovered alive elsewhere in its native New Guinea.
- The arboreal chinchilla rats (Cuscomys spp.), which were originally described based on a single species (Cuscomys oblativus) known only from archaeological remains discovered in ancient Inca tombs described in 1912 and believed to be extinct for almost a century. A second species (Cuscomys ashaninka) was discovered alive in Peru in 1999, and photographs taken at Machu Picchu in 2009 suggest that C. oblativus is still alive as well.
- Majorcan midwife toad (Alytes muletensis), in the family Alytidae, described from fossil remains in 1977, discovered alive in 1979.
- Cymatioa cookae, a small bivalve mollusk of family Galeommatidae; originally documented in 1937 from Pleistocene fossil specimens near Los Angeles, then living specimens discovered in 2018 on the coast of Santa Barbara.
- Mountain pygmy possum (Burramys parvus), first discovered in the fossil record in 1895; rediscovered alive in 1966.
- Calliostoma bullatum, a species of deepwater sea snail; originally described in 1844 from fossil specimens in deep-water coral-related sediments from southern Italy, until extant individuals were described in 2019 from deep-water coral reefs off the coast of Mauritania.

=== From Neogene (23 to 2.6 million years ago) ===
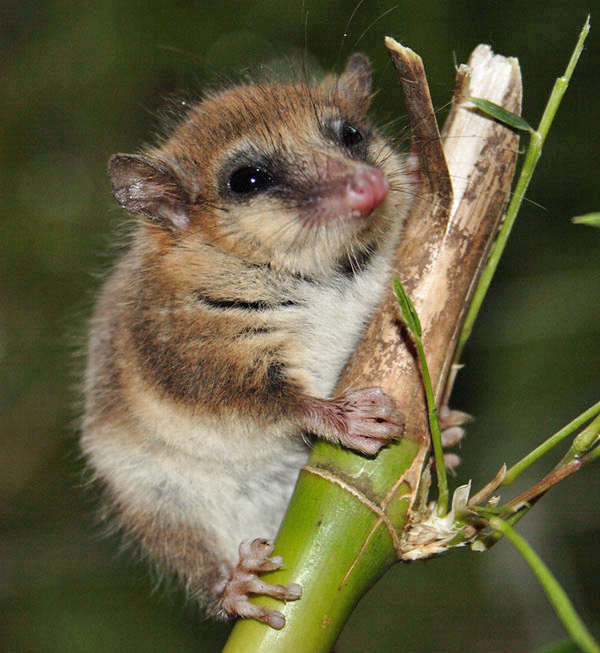
Monito del monte

- Nightcap oak (Eidothea hardeniana and Eidothea zoexylocarya), representing a genus previously known only from fossils 15 to 20 million years old, were recognized in 2000 and 1995, respectively.
- Cuvier's beaked whale (Ziphius cavirostris), first described by French naturalist and zoologist Georges Cuvier based on a skull collected on the Mediterranean coast of France at Fos-sur-mer, Bouches-du-Rhône, in 1804. He believed this represented the remains of an extinct species. Later in 1850, paleontologist and zoologist Paul Geravis found the skull to be identical to that of a stranded whale carcass he had just examined.
- Gracilidris, a genus of dolichoderine ants thought to have gone extinct 15–20 million years ago was found in Paraguay, Brazil, and Argentina and redescribed in 2006.
- Laotian rock rat (Laonastes aenigmamus), a member of a family (Diatomyidae) thought to have gone extinct 11 million years ago; found in 1996.
- Monito del monte (Dromiciops gliroides), sole surviving member of the order Microbiotheria; first described in 1894, thought to have gone extinct 11 million years ago.
- Submyotodon, a genus of bat originally known from a single fossil species (S. petersbuchensis) described in 2003 from the Miocene of Germany, about 11 to 16 million years ago. In 2015, a phylogenetic analysis of bats from Taiwan and China found three species previously classified in Myotis (M. caliginosus, M. latirostris, and M. moupinensis) to be wholly distinct from any other member of Myotis, and instead more closely allied to the fossil Submyotodon, and thus reclassified them in Submyotodon, making the genus extant once more.
- Dawn redwood (Metasequoia), a genus of conifer, described as a fossil in 1941, rediscovered alive in 1944.
- Wollemi (Wollemia), a genus of coniferous tree in the family Araucariaceae; previously known only from fossils from 2 to 90 million years ago, rediscovered in 1994.

=== From Paleogene (66 to 23 million years ago) ===
- Archaeidae, a family of spiders found in Madagascar, South Africa, and Australia, originally described from amber found in Europe, dating to the Eocene in the 1840. In 1881, the first living pelican spiders were discovered in Madagascar, and in 2003, Afarchaea grimaldii was described from Cretaceous Burmese amber aged between 88 and 95 million years.
- Lignobrycon, a characiform fish from southern Brazil, was originally described from well-preserved fossil remains from the late Oligocene in 1929. In 1998, the extant fish "Moojenichthys" myersi, described in 1956, was identified as belonging to the same genus as the fossil Lignobrycon.
- Juliidae, a family of small sea snails known only from Eocene fossil shells, and not surprisingly, these fossils were interpreted as being the shells of bivalves. Until the mid-20th century, these creatures were still considered to be bivalves. Then, in 1959, living individuals of one species were collected on the green alga, Caulerpa, in Japan. It was immediately clear that these animals were, in fact, unusual gastropods with a two-part shell. The first-discovered live species of bivalved gastropod was Tamanovalva limax, described by Kawaguti & Baba (1959) Once the habitat, appearance, and life habits of these very small and inconspicuous animals were understood, researchers in subsequent years were able to find a number of other species and genera in different parts of the world, also living on various species of Caulerpa.

=== From Cretaceous (145 to 66 million years ago) ===
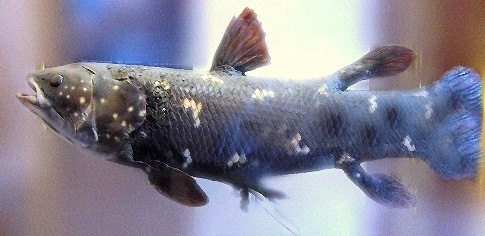
Coelacanth Latimeria chalumnae

- Coelacanth (Latimeria), a member of a subclass (Actinistia) thought to have gone extinct 66 million years ago; live specimens found in 1938.
- Alavesia, a genus of Atelestid fly, originally discovered as a fossil in amber over 100 million years old in 1999, living species found in Namibia in 2010.

=== From Permian (299 to 252 million years ago) ===
- Pozabudnutie, a genus of cockroach recorded from both late Permian sediments in Siberia and mid-Cretaceous Burmese amber

=== From Devonian (419 to 359 million years ago) ===
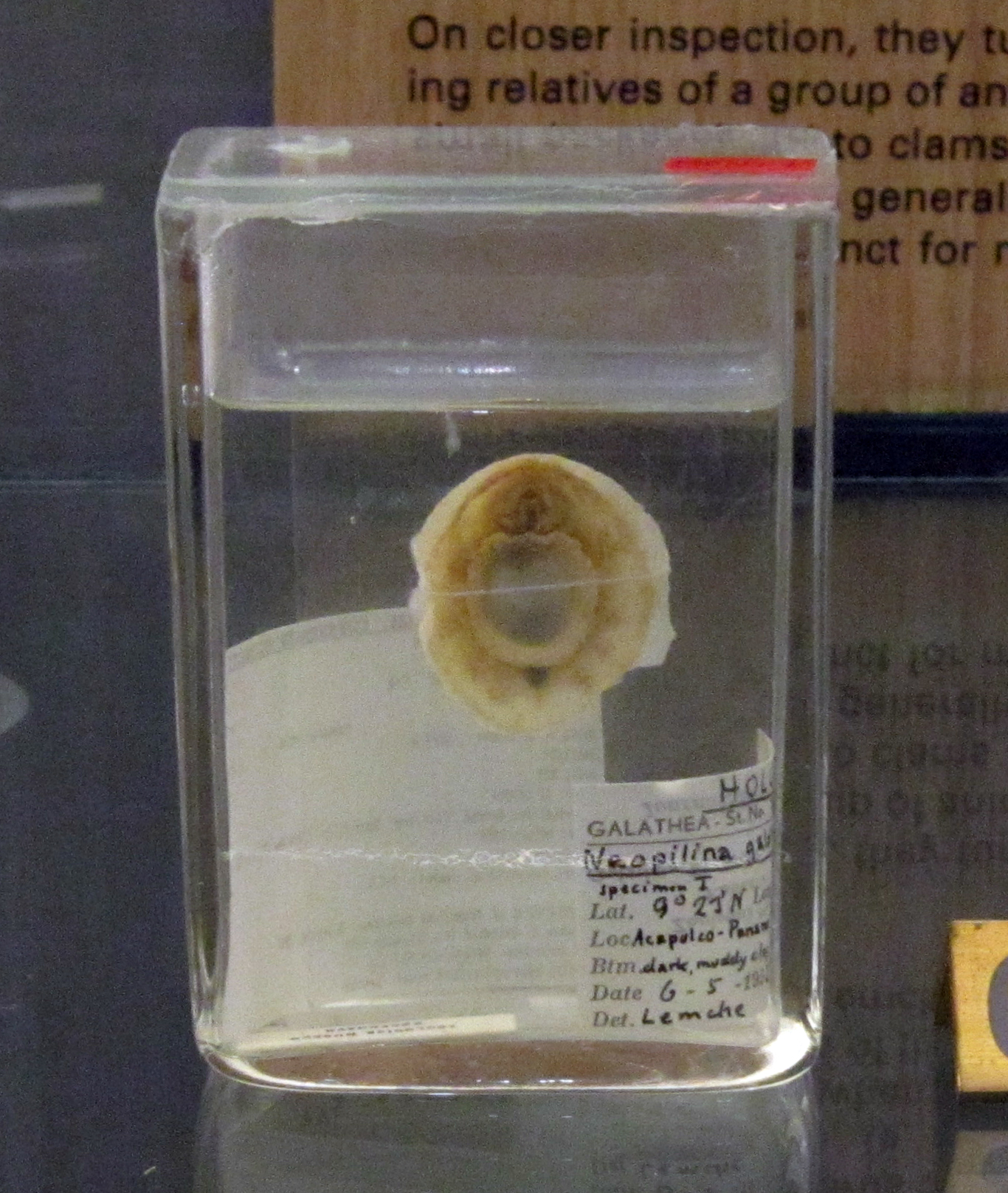
Monoplacophora

- Monoplacophora, a class of molluscs believed to have gone extinct in the middle Devonian Period (c. 380 million years ago) until living members were discovered in deep water off Costa Rica in 1952.

=== From Cambrian (539 to 485 million years ago) ===
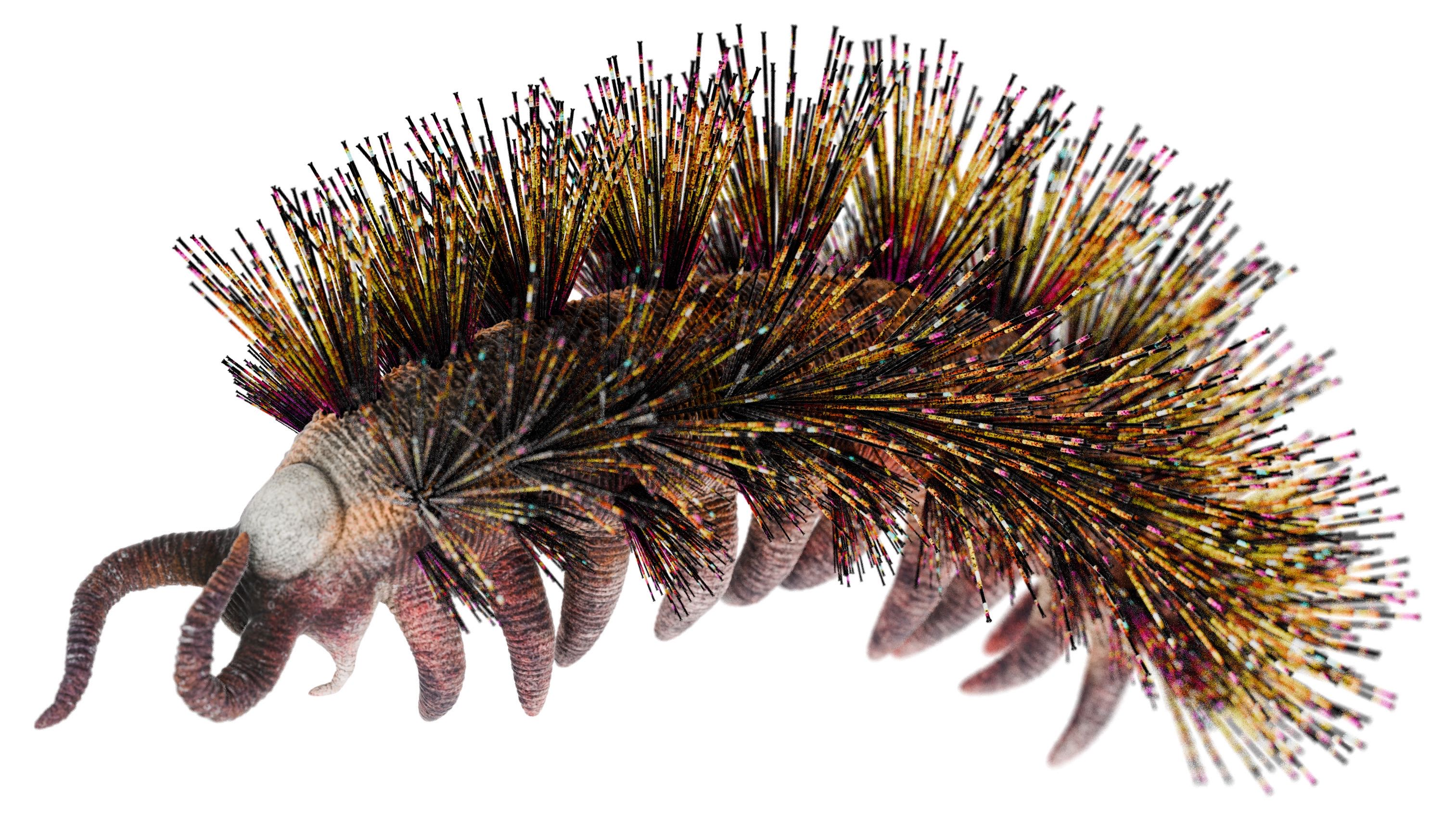
Reconstruction of Palaeocampa anthrax

- Schinderhannes bartelsi, an extinct Devonian member of the order Radiodonta. The discovery of its fossils in Devonian was astonishing because previously, radiodonts were known only from the Cambrian, 100 million years earlier.
- Carbotubulus waloszeki, an extinct genus of long-legged lobopodian related to the famous Hallucigenia. While the rest of its family (Hallucigeniidae) died out in the Cambrian, this animal persisted into the Late Carboniferous and is known from the Mazon Creek fossil beds.
- Palaeocampa anthrax, a lobopodian of the family Aysheaiidae that lived in freshwater and had venomous spines. It hailed from the Late Carboniferous Mazon Creek fossil beds in addition to the Montceau-les-Mines lagerstätte, and is notable for outliving its Cambrian relatives such as Aysheaia.
- It was discovered that the living genus Rhabdopleura is an extant graptolite, which was previously known from the Middle Cambrian through the Lower Carboniferous.

== Reappearing IUCN red list species ==
=== Plants ===
- Afrothismia pachyantha, in the family Burmanniaceae; first discovered in 1905, rediscovered in 1995.
- Ascension Island parsley fern (Anogramma ascensionis), last collected in 1958 and declared extinct in 2003, rediscovered in 2010.
- Asplundia clementinae, a species of plant in the family Cyclanthaceae.
- Astragalus nitidiflorus, rediscovered in 2004 after 100 years.
- Badula platyphylla, a species of plant in the family Primulaceae.
- Blunt chaff flower (Achyranthes mutica), a species of plant in the family Amaranthaceae.
- Bulbophyllum filiforme, a species of epiphytic plant in the family Orchidaceae; first botanically described in 1895.
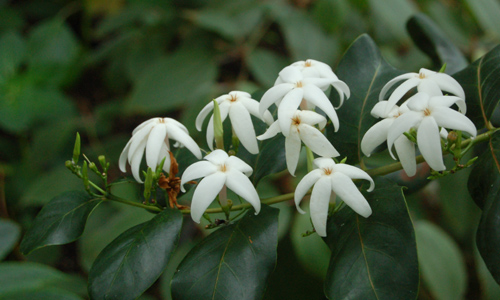
  Café marron
- Café marron (Ramosmania rodriguesii), thought extinct in the 1950s, but rediscovered in 1980.
- Camellia piquetiana, in the family Theaceae; discovered in the 19th century, rediscovered in 2003.
- Climbing alsinidendron (Alsinidendron viscosum), in the family Caryophyllaceae.
- Cobungra leek orchid (Prasophyllum morganii), known from a single population in Victoria, last seen in 1933, until its rediscovery in 2020.
- Dawn redwood (Metasequoia glyptostroboides)
- Erythrina schliebenii, rediscovered in 2001.
- Eugenia bojeri, a species of plant in the family Myrtaceae.
- Euphrasia arguta, a plant from the genus Euphrasia, in the family Orobanchaceae; thought extinct since 1904, rediscovered 2008.
- Exacum loheri, a species of flowering plant in the family Gentianaceae; last seen in 1895, and rediscovered in 2025 in the Masungi Georeserve in Rizal, Philippines.
- Franciscan manzanita (Arctostaphylos hookeri), thought to be extinct in the wild since 1942, rediscovered in 2009.
- Furbish's lousewort (Pedicularis furbishiae), Canadian species identified as an extinct species in 1880, rediscovered in the 1970s.
- Gasteranthus extinctus, first seen in 1985 and described in 2000 after being considered extinct, rediscovered in 2022.
- Gyrocaryum oppositifolium, discovered in 1983, not seen again until 2025.
- Ilex gardneriana, last seen in 1873, rediscovered before 2017.
- Jellyfish tree (Medusagyne oppositifolia), the only member of the genus Medusagyne, of the family Ochnaceae; thought extinct until 1970.
- Limahuli Valley cyanea (Cyanea kuhihewa), last collected in 1991, rediscovered in 2006.
- Madhuca diplostemon, a tree in the family Sapotaceae; first collected in 1835, rediscovered in 2019.
- Mammillaria schwarzii, a species of plant in the family Cactaceae; thought to be extinct for some time, until rediscovered in 1987.
- Millettia sacleuxii, last seen in 2004, rediscovered in 2023.
- Molokai cyanea (Cyanea procera), in the bellflower family.
- Mount Diablo buckwheat (Eriogonom truncatum), in the family Polygonaceae; thought to be extinct around 1935, but found again in 2005, then again in 2016.
- Neglected tuft sedge (Bulbostylis neglecta), an endemic member of the family Cyperaceae; first collected in 1806, rediscovered in 2008.
- Pernambuco holly (Ilex sapiiformis), native to the Atlantic Forest of Brazil and not seen since 1837; rediscovered in Igarassu, Pernambuco in 2023.
- Pittosporum tanianum, a species of plant in the family Pittosporaceae.
- Pycnandra longiflora, first recorded in 1860s, found again in 2016.
- Pygmy goosefoot (Dysphania pusilla), thought extinct since 1959, but rediscovered in 2015.
- Ravine cyanea (Cyanea dunbariae), in the bellflower family; rediscovered in 1992.
- Rhaphidospora cavernarum, a plant species in the family Acanthaceae; thought to be extinct since 1873, but relocated in 2008.
- Samar rafflesia (Rafflesia manillana), a parasitic species of flower in the family Rafflesiaceae last seen in March 2011, rediscovered in 2026.
- Santa Ynez groundstar (Ancistrocarphus keilii), described in 2004, not seen again until 2023.
- She cabbage tree (Lachanodes arborea) a small tree in the family Asteraceae.
- Sicilian fir (Abies nebrodensis), in the family Pinaceae.
- Sri Lanka legume (Crudia zeylanica), last seen in 1911 and presumed extinct, until it was rediscovered in 2019
- Stenostomum tomentosum, in the family Rubiaceae; first discovered in 1780, rediscovered in 1975.
- Takhtajania perrieri, a genus of flowering plants in the family Winteraceae; first collected in 1909, rediscovered, and reclassified multiple times between 1963 and 1997.
- Thismia kobensis, discovered in 1992 and described in 2010, rediscovered in 2021.
- Thismia neptunis, discovered in 1866 and described in 1878, rediscovered in 2017.
- Turbinicarpus gielsdorfianus, a species of plant in the family Cactaceae.
- Virginia round-leaf birch (Betula uber), a rare species of tree in the birch family; first discovered in 1914, thought to be extinct until 1975
- Velvet pitcher plant ( (Nepenthes mollisr), a rare species of pitcher plant; last seen in 1918, until its rediscovery in 2019
- Waterfall fountainbush (Psoralea cataracta), known from a single specimen collected in 1804, rediscovered over 200 years later in 2019.
- Wood's hau kuahiwi (Hibiscadelphus woodii), a species of flowering plant in the family Malvaceae, declared extinct in 2016, and rediscovered three years later.
- Yellow fatu (Abutilon pitcairnense), a species of plant in the family Malvaceae. The plant was once considered extinct until 2003.
- York groundsel (Senecio eboracensis), a daisy native to York, England that disappeared by 2000, seeds were rediscovered in the Millennium Seed Bank and were replanted in 2023.
- Zamia lindleyi, rediscovered in 2012.

==== Cultivars ====
- Judean date palm, a distinct cultivar of date palm that disappeared around the 14th century, seeds dated from between 155 BC to 64 AD were found in the 1960s and were replanted in 2005.
- Montreal melon, a common commercial plant in the 19th century that disappeared in the 1920s but was rediscovered after a couple of generations in a seed bank in 1996, replanted in 2024.

=== Fungi ===
- Big puma fungus (Austroomphaliaster nahuelbutensis), seen once in the wild in Chile in the 1980s, rediscovered in 2023.
- Caloplaca allanii, last recorded in 1932, rediscovered in 2013 in the Waitākere Ranges of New Zealand.
- Gardner's glowing mushroom (Neonothopanus gardneri), described in Goiás state in Brazil in 1840, rediscovered in 2005.
- Usnea lambii, last seen in 1942, rediscovered in 1972.

=== Sponges ===
- Neptune's cup (Cliona patera), a species of demosponge in the family Clionaidae; thought to be extinct from overharvesting in 1908, rediscovered in 2011.

=== Cnidarians ===
- Alatina grandis, a species of box jellyfish in the family Alatinidae; last seen in 1933 or 1934 and thought to be extinct, rediscovered in 2014.
- Crambione cooki, presumed extinct until 2013.
- Scolymia cubensis, a species of stony coral in the family Mussidae; last recorded in 1849, rediscovered over 100 years later in 1971.
- Wellington's solitary coral (Rhizopsammia wellingtoni), a species of stony coral in the family Dendrophylliidae; thought to be extinct after the El Niño events of 1982 and 1983 destroyed most of its existing population and it was last seen in 2000, rediscovered off of Isabela and Fernandina in 2024.

=== Annelids ===
- Hirudobdella antipodum, a species of leech endemic to Open Bay Islands of New Zealand. The species was thought to have gone extinct in 1969 due to the introduced weka until its rediscovery in 1987.
- Giant Palouse earthworm (Driloleirus americanus), a species of earthworm belonging to the genus Driloleirus; thought extinct in the 1980s, but found again in 2006.
- Oregon giant earthworm (Driloleirus macelfreshi), a species of earthworm endemic to the state of Oregon; thought to be extinct in 1985, rediscovered in 2008.

=== Onychophorans ===
- Oroperipatus eisenii, last seen in 1900, rediscovered in 2007.
- Typhloperipatus williamsoni, a species of velvet worm last seen in 1913 in the Himalayas, rediscovered in 2025.

=== Insects ===
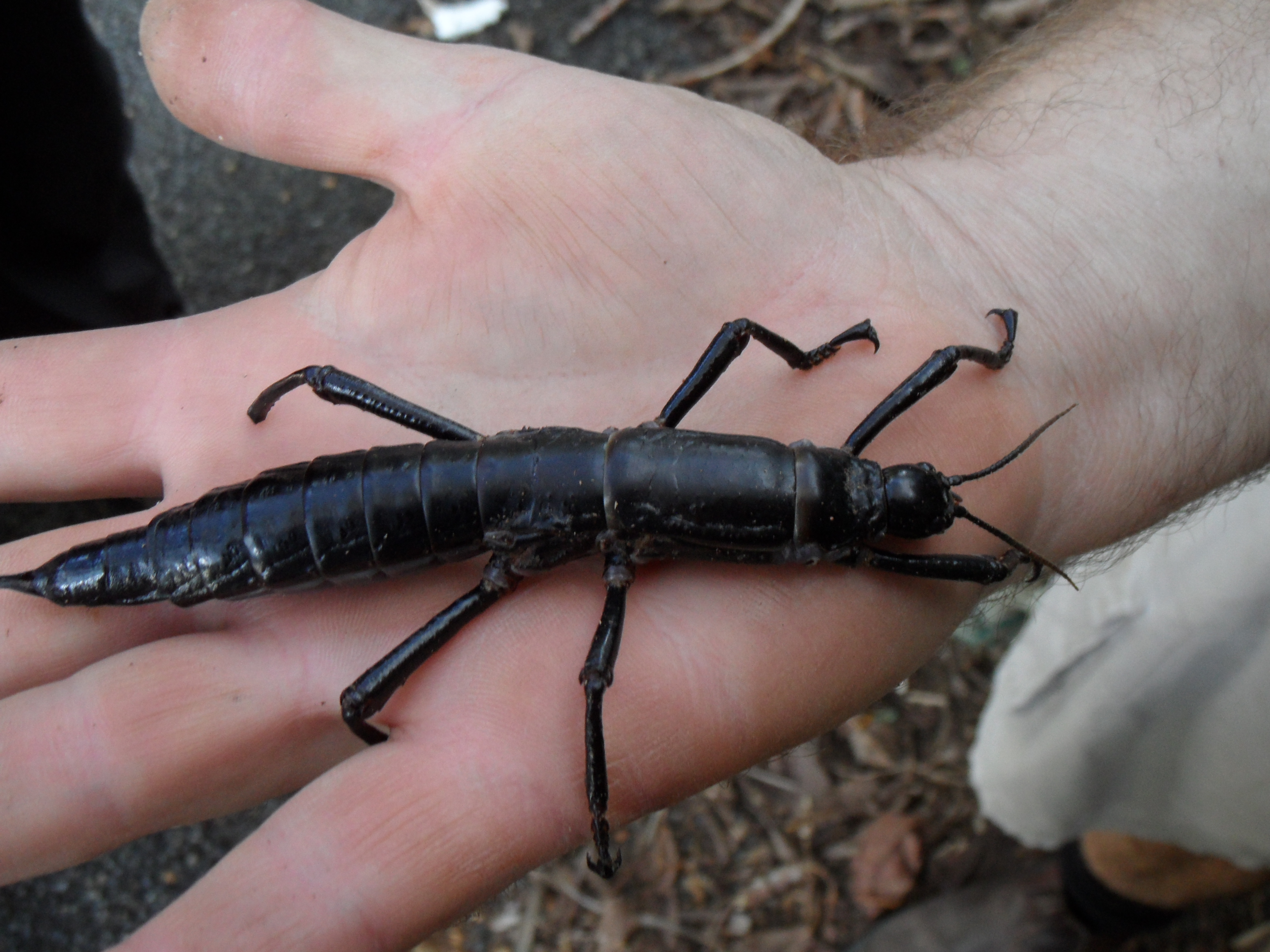
Lord Howe Island stick insect

- Actinote zikani, considered extinct after no sightings after 1981, rediscovered in 1991 in the state of São Paulo. It is one of two butterflies on the list of the 100 Most Endangered Species in the World published by the International Union for Conservation of Nature (IUCN) and the Zoological Society of London in September 2012.
- Adam's forest damselfly (Drepanosticta adami), last collected in 1932, rediscovered in 2006.
- Amani flatwing (Amanipodagrion gilliesi), last recorded in 1962, rediscovered in 2003, it is one of three species of damselfly on the list of the 100 Most Endangered Species in the World published in 2012.
- Appalachian grasshopper (Appalachia hebardi), last seen in 1946 before being rediscovered in 2024 in Virginia.
- Apteromantis bolivari, last documented in 1938, rediscovered in 2011.
- Atala butterfly (Eumaeus atala), disappeared in early 20th century, rediscovered in 1959.
- Aweme borer moth (Papaipema aweme), last documented in 1938, rediscovered in 2005.
- Austen's forest damselfly (Drepanosticta austeni), last seen in 1938, rediscovered in 2001.
- Basilewsky's cranefly (Dicranomyia basilewskyana), last seen in the 1960s, rediscovered in 2015 when one landed on an entomologist in Saint Helena.
- Bone skipper fly (Thyreophora cynophila), last seen in 1850 before being photographed in Spain in 2009.
- Balkan mountain frost moth (Lignyoptera thaumastaria), last seen in Bosnia and Herzegovina in 1937, and in 1982 in Montenegro, was rediscovered in Bosnia in 2023.
- Bembidion palosverdes, last seen in 1964, rediscovered on Santa Catalina Island in 2010.
- Blackburn's sphinx moth (Manduca blackburni), last recorded in 1970, rediscovered in isolated locations on East Maui, Kaho'olawe, and Hawaii in 1986.
- Bombus irisanensis, a species of bumblebee endemic to Luzon in the Philippines last documented in the 1990s, rediscovered in 2019.
- Bordered knob-tipped shadowdamsel (Drepanosticta submontana), last recorded in 1924, rediscovered in 2001.
- Canterbury knobbed weevil (Hadramphus tuberculatus), last seen in 1922 until it was rediscovered in 2004.
- Ceylon clubtail dragonfly (Heliogomphus ceylonicus), last seen in 1962, rediscovered in 2021.
- Ceres stream-damsel (Spesbona angusta), known from only two specimens with the last being collected in 1920 near Ceres, rediscovered in 2003.
- Chersadaula ochrogastra, rediscovered in 2020 after a user from iNaturalist posted pictures of the species, being the first time it had been recorded since the 1920s.
- Chiretolpis erubescens, a species of moth discovered in 1891 in the Western Ghats of India, rediscovered in 2024.
- Cloaked bee (Hylaeus lactiferus), believed to be extinct in 1923 until it was rediscovered in 2018.
- Cockerell's bumblebee (Bombus cockerelli), last seen in 1956, rediscovered in 2011.
- Coelhydrus brevicollis, last recorded in 1950, rediscovered in 2005.
- Coenagrion persicum, endemic to Iran last seen in 1937, rediscovered in 2015.
- Confused moth (Helicoverpa confusa), last seen in 1927, rediscovered in 1997.
- Cymindis alutacea, last recorded in 1867, rediscovered in 2014.
- Dinosaur ant (Nothomyrmecia macrops), a rare genus of ants consisting of a single species, discovered in 1931, not seen again until 1977.
- Drosophila lanaiensis, a fly endemic to Lana'i last seen in 1893, rediscovered in 2010.
- Drosophila obatai, a fly endemic to the island of Oahu last seen in 1971, rediscovered in 2011.
- Dyticopycna sylvia, known from a few specimens collected in 1906, rediscovered in 2006.
- Elusive Skimmer (Orthetrum rubens), endemic to Western Cape in South Africa last seen in 1977, rediscovered in 2014.
- Emerald Sri Lanka spreadwing (Sinhalestes orientalis), thought to have gone extinct after the species was described in 1863, rediscovered in the Peak Wilderness Sanctuary in Sri Lanka in 2012.
- Epeoloides pilosulus, last seen in 1960, leading to speculation that this species was extinct, until it was found in 2002 in Nova Scotia.
- Florida scorpionfly (Panorpa floridana), last seen in 1982, rediscovered in 2010 at Gold Head Branch State Park.
- Fox's short-wing grasshopper (Melanoplus foxi), thought to be extinct in 1938, rediscovered in 2015.
- Frightful hairy fly (Mormotomyia hirsuta), last collected in 1948, rediscovered in 2010.
- Frosted phoenix (Titanomis sisyrota), known only from 10 specimens, with the last being collected in 1959, rediscovered in 2024.
- Fruhstorfer's junglewatcher (Hylaeothemis fruhstorferi), last recorded in the 1930s, rediscovered in 2004.
- Hine's emerald (Somatochlora hineana), last seen in the 1950s, rediscovered in 1988.
- Island marble butterfly (Euchloe ausonides insulana), last observed in 1908 on Gabriola Island, British Columbia, rediscovered in San Juan Island National Historical Park in 1998.
- Izatha psychra, last seen in 1883, rediscovered in 2000, then again in 2021 near Lake Pukaki.
- Leichhardt's grasshopper (Petasida ephippigera), thought to be extinct from 1900 until 1971, when a single male specimen was spotted, followed by a breeding pair shortly afterwards.
- Leptochilus quintus, a species of potter wasp known from a single specimen collected in 1885 in Podvežica, a part of the nowadays Rijeka in Croatia, rediscovered when six males were collected on the mountain of Mosor in 2021.
- Lestes patricia, a species of damselfly discovered in 1924. Only a single male specimen was collected during the discovery. The species was feared extinct until 2020 where it was rediscovered.
- Libellulosoma minutum, collected once in 1913, rediscovered in Sainte Luce Reserve in 2016.
- Lord Howe Island stick insect (Dryococelus australis), thought to be extinct by 1920, rediscovered in 2001 on Ball's Pyramid, the species is sometimes considered "the rarest insect in the world".
- Lord Howe Island wood-feeding cockroach (Panesthia lata), thought to be extinct in 1918, rediscovered in 2022.
- Ludlow's Bhutan swallowtail (Bhutanitis ludlowi), only known from a few specimens collected between 1933-1934, rediscovered in 2009 in the Bumdeling Wildlife Sanctuary, located in Trashiyangtse. It later became the national butteryfly of Bhutan.
- Lyrate grappletail (Heliogomphus lyratus), last seen in 1926, rediscovered in 2009.
- Mahé boulder cricket (Phalangacris alluaudi), a species of grasshopper in the family Phalangopsidae endemic to Mahé island in Seychelles last seen in 1909, rediscovered in 2014.
- Maspalomas bow-legged grasshopper (Dericorys minutus), is a species of grasshopper of the family Acrididae endemic to Gran Canaria Island last seen in 1949, rediscovered in 2015.
- Mauve bluet (Proischnura polychromatica), last recorded in 1963, rediscovered in 2002.
- Merry shadowdamsel (Drepanosticta hilaris), last seen in 1970, rediscovered in 2003.
- Megachile cypricola, a species of leafcutter bee endemic to Cyprus last seen in 1950, rediscovered in 2015.
- Miami tiger beetle (Cicindela floridana), last seen in 1934, rediscovered in 2007 near Miami.
- Micraspis flavovittata, a species of ladybird not seen since 1940, thought to be extinct until an amateur naturalist found about 40 individuals of the species in the Discovery Bay Coastal Park in western Victoria in 2014.
- Miena jewel beetle (Castiarina insculpta), last seen in 1965, rediscovered in 2004.
- Mono Lake diving beetle (Hygrotus artus), known from the holotype collected in 1919 falsely labeled as being collected from Lake Mono, rediscovered in 2017.
- Monte Gordo grasshopper (Eyprepocprifas insularis), only known from a single specimen collected in 1980 and declared extinct in 1996, rediscovered in 2023.
- Nietner's grappletail (Heliogomphus nietneri), last documented in 1878 and feared extinct, rediscovered in 2005.
- Olinga fumosa, known from a single specimen collected in Waitati in 1917, rediscovered in 1992.
- Oricopis insulana, last seen in the 1880s on Lord Howe Island, rediscovered in 2017.
- Oriental blue clearwing (Heterosphecia tawonoides), known from a single specimen collected in 1887 and formally described in 2003, the species was rediscovered in 2013.
- Palos Verdes blue (Glaucopsyche lygdamus palosverdesensis), last seen in 1983, rediscovered in 1994.
- Pararrhaptica leopardellus, last recorded in 1920 on the island of Kauai, rediscovered in 2022.
- Passenger pigeon chewing louse (Columbicola extinctus), thought to be extinct in the 1900s prior to the extinction to its host, rediscovered in 1999 by living on the band-tailed pigeon.
- Pennington's blue (Lepidochrysops penningtoni), last recorded in 1963, rediscovered in 2021.
- Pitt Island longhorn beetle (Xylotoles costatus), last seen on Pitt Island in 1910, and found again on a nearby island in the Chatham Islands in 1987.
- Polyura inopinatus, collected once in 1939, rediscovered in New Britain in 2015.
- Rhadine ozarkensis, last seen in 1940, rediscovered in 2013.
- Rottnest bee (Hesperocolletes douglasi), known from a single specimen collected on Rottnest Island in 1938, rediscovered in 2015.
- Saint Francis's satyr (Neonympha mitchellii francisci), discovered in 1980 and believed to go extinct shortly after, rediscovered in 1992 in Fort Bragg, a military base in North Carolina.
- Seychelles bee-hawkmoth (Cephonodes tamsi), known from a single male collected in 1911, rediscovered in 1997.
- Seychelles hummingbird hawkmoth (Macroglossum alluaudi), last seen in 1894 on Mahé, rediscovered in 2000 on Silhouette in the Seychelles.
- Schizodactylus inexspectatus, a dune-inhabiting cricket from Turkey, known from a single specimen seen in 1901 and presumed extinct until it was found again in 2005.
- Scott's stick insect (Carausius scotti), rediscovered in 1990.
- Smoky-winged threadtail (Elattoneura leucostigma), last seen in 1927, rediscovered in 2009.
- Stoffberg widow (Dingana fraterna), last seen in 2002, rediscovered in 2014.
- Stygoporus oregonensis, known from eight specimens collected in 1984, rediscovered in 2014.
- Table Mountain hairy crawling water beetle (Algophilus lathridioides), last seen in 1946, rediscovered in 2006.
- Velvety stonian horsefly (Stonemyia velutina), thought to be extinct in 1996 after no sightings of the species since 1942, rediscovered in 2023.
- Wallace's giant bee (Megachile pluto), the world's largest bee. Not seen after 1858, when it was first collected, until it was rediscovered in 1981, and thought to be extinct again until 2019.
- Yellow-crested spangle (Papilio elephenor), last seen in 1909, rediscovered in 2009 in Assam.

=== Crustaceans ===
- Caridina linduensis, known from a few specimen collected in Lake Lindu and effluent streams in Sulawesi in 1904, rediscovered in 2011.
- Chihuahua dwarf crayfish (Cambarellus chihuahuae), last recorded in 1979, rediscovered 2012, two years after being labeled extinct.
- Ciliopagurus liui, a species of Hermit Crab in the family Diogenidae last seen in 1995, rediscovered in 2013.
- Dandenong amphipod (Austrogammarus australis), last seen in 1911, rediscovered in 1997.
- Nickajack Cave isopod (Caecidotea nickajackensis): believed to have gone extinct in 1967 after the Nickajack Cave flooded by the building of the Nickajack Dam, it was later rediscovered in 2013 in both Horseskull Cave and Raccoon Mountain Caverns.
- Sierra Leone river crab (Afrithelphusa leonensis), recorded from three specimens in Sierra Leone in 1955, and Afzelius's crab (Afrithelphusa afzelii), recorded from two specimens from before 1800 in Sierra Leone, both rediscovered in 2021 by biologist Pierre Mvogo Ndongo.
- Shelta Cave crayfish (Orconectes sheltae), described in 1997 after last being seen in 1988, rediscovered in 2019.

=== Arachnids ===
- Chrysilla volupe, described from a male specimen in 1879, rediscovered in 2018.
- Fagilde's trapdoor spider (Nemesia berlandi), first recorded from two specimens in 1931 in Portugal, rediscovered in 2023.
- Lake Fenton trapdoor spider (Plesiothele fentoni), last seen in 1932, rediscovered in 1995.
- Orphnaecus pellitus, first recorded in 1892, not seen again until 2025.
- Prasmiola unica, last collected in 1942, rediscovered on iNaturalist in 2020.

=== Fish ===
- Ajamaru Lakes rainbowfish (Melanotaenia ajamaruensis), last seen in 1955, rediscovered in 2007.
- Chilean angelshark (Squatina armata), known from a single specimen found in 1887, rediscovered in 2024.
- Batman River loach (Paraschistura chrysicristinae), a loach species not seen since 1970s. Rediscovered in 2021.
- Black kokanee (Oncorhynchus kawamurae), a Japanese species of salmon in the family Salmonidae; believed extinct in 1940 after attempts at conservation seemingly failed. The species was rediscovered in Saiko Lake in 2010, having survived after prior conservation efforts had introduced it there.
- Borna snakehead (Channa amphibeus), a snakehead species last seen in 1933, later rediscovered in 2025.
- Borneo shark (Carcharhinus borneensis), known from only five specimens collected before 1937, rediscovered in Sabah and Sarawak in 2004.
- Dumbéa River pipefish (Microphis cruentus), described in 1981 from individuals captured in 1944, not seen until photos of the species were posted to iNaturalist in 2020.
- Estuarine pipefish (Syngnathus watermeyeri), declared extinct in 1994, rediscovered in 2006 in a place it had not been reported in for over four decades.
- Flapnose houndshark (Scylliogaleus quecketti), not seen by biologists since 1902, one was captured in 2020 on the show Extinct or Alive.
- Ganges shark (Glyphis gangeticus), the world's sole freshwater shark found in the Ganges River and Brahmaputra River in India and Bangladesh; previously only known from three museum specimens caught in the early 19th century, but was rediscovered at a fish market in Mumbai in February 2016.
- Giant salmon carp (Aaptosyax grypus), a carp species feared extinct in 2004, rediscovered in 2022.
- Giant featherback (Chitala lopis), declared extinct in 2020, rediscovered at the type locality in 2023.
- Haplochromis microdon, a cichlid species endemic to Lake Victoria, last seen in 1985, rediscovered when two males were found in 2023 and 2024.
- Mesopotamian barbel (Luciobarbus subquincunciatus), a barbel species last seen in 2012, later rediscovered in 2024.
- Miller Lake lamprey (Entosphenus minimus), a lamprey species endemic to the U.S. state of Oregon thought to be extinct after eradication efforts in 1958, until it was rediscovered in 1992.
- Ornate sleeper-ray (Electrolux addisoni), first recorded in 1984 but was not described until 2007.
- Sailback houndshark (Gogolia filewoodi), a species of houndshark, in the family Triakidae known from a single specimen collected in 1970 in Astrolabe Bay of Papua New Guinea, rediscovered in 2020.
- Shortnose cisco (Coregonus reighardi), a whitefish species last seen in 1985, was rediscovered in 2024 in Lake Superior, where it is not previously known to have lived.
- Smoothtooth blacktip shark (Carcharhinus leiodon), a species of requiem shark, in the family Carcharhinidae; known only from a specimen caught in 1902, the shark was rediscovered at a fish market in 2008.
- Speartooth shark (Glyphis glyphis), discovered in 1839, not seen again until 1982.
- Spinach pipefish (Microphis spinachioides), last recorded by scientists in 1985 and later put on the 10 Most Wanted Lost Fish Species by Shoal. It was rediscovered in the Sepik River in Papua New Guinea in 2026.
- Whitetip weasel shark (Paragaleus leucolomatus), purportively rediscovered in 2020.

=== Amphibians ===
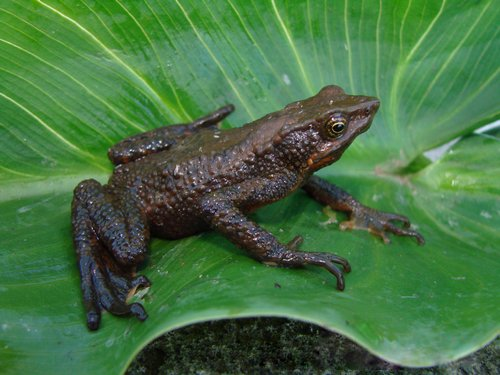
Atelopus nahumae

- Alsodes vittatus, a frog in the family Alsodidae; last seen in 1893 until it was rediscovered in 2024.
- American cinchona plantation treefrog (Isthmohyla rivularis), a rare species of frog in the family Hylidae; thought to have become extinct by 1988, until its rediscovery in 2007.
- Anamalai dot frog (Uperodon anamalaiensis), known from a single specimen collected in 1937, rediscovered in 2010 in Parambikulam Wildlife Sanctuary.
- Armoured frog (Litoria lorica), a species of frog in the family Hylidae; thought to have gone extinct in 1991 until its rediscovery in 2008.
- Black jumping salamander (Ixalotriton niger), a species of salamander in the family Plethodontidae; believed to be extinct, until rediscovered in 2000 and again in 2006 and 2007.
- Bocaina big tooth frog (Phantasmarana bocainensis), last seen in 1968, rediscovered using eDNA metabarcoding in 2020.
- Bolivian Cochran frog (Nymphargus bejaranoi), not seen since 2002, rediscovered in early 2020 in Carrasco National Park.
- Bornean rainbow toad (Ansonia latidisca), rediscovered in 2011 after being unseen since 1924.
- Branch's rain frog (Breviceps branchi), last seen in 2008, rediscovered in 2023.
- Bururi long-fingered frog (Cardioglossa cyaneospila), last recorded in 1949, rediscovered in 2011.
- Cave splayfoot salamander (Chiropterotriton mosaueri), no sightings of this species after 1943, rediscovered in 2010.
- Chalazodes bubble-nest frog (Philautus chalazodes), a species of frog in the family Rhacophoridae; no verifiable reports of this species after 1874 and was presumed extinct until its rediscovery in 2011.
- Confusing rocket frog (Ectopoglossus confusus), thought to be extinct in 1989 until it was rediscovered in 2016.
- Costa Rican variable harlequin toad (Atelopus varius), a toad endemic to the Talamancan montane forests, between Costa Rica and Panama.
- Dehradun stream frog (Amolops chakrataensis), known from a single specimen collected in 1985, rediscovered in 2011.
- Elegant dancing frog (Micrixalus elegans), known from a single specimen collected in 1937, rediscovered in 2010.
- Foothill robber frog (Eleutherodactylus semipalmatus), not reported since 1985 and thought to be extinct, rediscovered in 2011.
- Guajira stubfoot toad (Atelopus carrikeri), last seen in 1994, rediscovered 2008.
- Guttman's Stream frog (Pulchrana guttmani), feared to be extinct for 27 years until its rediscovery in 2020.
- Hula painted frog (Discoglossus nigriventer), the only living member of the genus Latonia; thought to be extinct in the 1950s, until it was rediscovered in 2011.
- Jackson's climbing salamander (Bolitoglossa jacksoni), only recorded from mid-1970s in Guatemala, rediscovered in a 2017 expedition.
- Jambato harlequin frog (Atelopus ignescens), a species of toad in the family Bufonidae; thought to be extinct since its last recorded sighting in 1988, until its rediscovery in 2016.
- Kandyan dwarf toad (Adenomus kandianus), last seen in Sri Lanka in 1872, rediscovered in 2009.
- Kelaart's starry shrub frog (Pseudophilautus stellatus), last seen in 1853, rediscovered in 2009.
- Large-crested toad (Incilius cristatus), a critically endangered species of true toad in the family Bufonidae; thought to be extinct until its rediscovery in 1999.
- Longnose stubfoot toad (Atelopus longirostris), Not recorded in 1989 rediscovered in March 2016.
- Mindo harlequin toad (Atelopus mindoensis), last seen in Ecuador in 1989, rediscovered in 2020.
- Molleturo robber frog (Pristimantis ruidus), last seen in 1922, rediscovered in 2022.
- Mount Nimba reed frog (Hyperolius nimbae), last seen in 1967, rediscovered in 2010.
- Mozart's frog (Eleutherodactylus amadeus), last seen in 1991, rediscovered in 2021.
- Northern tinker frog (Taudactylus rheophilus), a species of frog in the family Myobatrachidae.
- Omaniundu reed frog (Hyperolius sankuruensis), last seen in 1979, rediscovered in 2010.
- Painted frog (Atelopus ebenoides marinkellei), a species of true toad in the family Bufonidae, believed to be extinct since 1995, until it was rediscovered in 2006.
- Peru Andes frog (Noblella peruviana), last seen in 1900, rediscovered in 2014.
- Rio Santa Rosa salamander (Bolitoglossa digitigrada), a species of salamander in the family Plethodontidae. The species hasn't been seen since 1982 and feared extinct until it was rediscovered in 2022.
- Romer's tree frog (Liuixalus romeri), thought to be extinct in 1953 after a cave on Lamma Island collapsed, rediscovered in 1984.
- San Lorenzo harlequin toad (Atelopus nahumae), a species of toad in the family Bufonidae; thought to be extinct after there were no sightings after 1992, rediscovered in 2006
- San Lorenzo stubfoot toad (Atelopus laetissimus) a species of toad in the family Bufonidae; last seen in 1992, rediscovered in 2006
- Sambas stream toad (Ansonia latidisca) in the family Bufonidae; first discovered in 1924, until its rediscovery in 2011.
- Silent Valley Tropical Frog (Micrixalus thampii), known from a single specimen collected in 1981, rediscovered in 2010.
- Starry night toad (Atelopus arsyecue), not seen for over 30 years until rediscovery in 2019.
- Sumatra toad (Bufo sumatranus), a species of toad in the family Bufonidae.
- Telmatobufo venustus, a species of frog in the family Calyptocephalellidae, not seen from 1899 until 1999.
- Thorius minutissimus, a species of salamander in the family Plethodontidae.
- Webless shrub frog (Pseudophilautus hypomelas), discovered in 1876 in Sri Lanka not seen again until 2010.
- Yellow-spotted tree frog (Litoria castanea), No recorded sighting had been made since 1980, found again in 2009.

=== Mammals ===
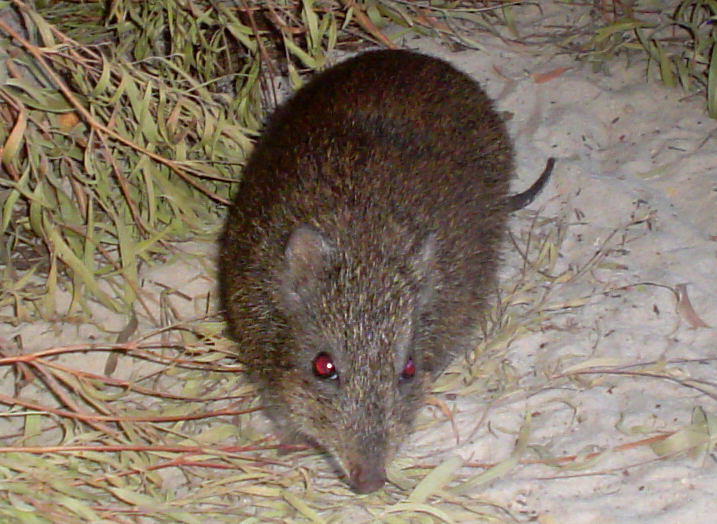
Gilbert's potoroo

- Abyssinian genet (Genetta abyssinica), a genet species endemic to Abyssinia, last seen in the 1950s until it was rediscovered in 2016
- Attenborough's long-beaked echidna (Zaglossus attenboroughi), echidna species found in Cyclops Mountains of Papua New Guinea; formerly last seen in 1962 and believed to be possibly extinct, until it was recorded again in November 2023.
- Bangka slow loris (Nycticebus bancanus), last seen in 1937 in Borneo, rediscovered in 2023.
- Bavarian pine vole (Microtus bavaricus), is a vole in the family Cricetidae; believed extinct in the 1960s, until it was rediscovered in 2000.
- Black-footed ferret (Mustela nigripes), a North American species presumed extinct in 1979 until it was rediscovered in 1981. A captive breeding program of the discovered ferrets successfully reintroduced the species into the wild.
- Black lion tamarin (Leontopithecus chrysopygus), last seen in 1905, rediscovered in 1970.
- Black wallaroo (Osphranter bernardus), a species of Wallaroo thought to be extinct in 1914, rediscovered in 1969.
- Brazilian arboreal mouse (Rhagomys rufescens), a South American rodent species of the family Cricetidae; first described in 1886, was believed to be extinct for over one hundred years.
- Brazilian three-banded armadillo (Tolypeutes tricinctus), last seen in 1973, rediscovered in 1993.
- Brown hairy dwarf porcupine (Coendou vestitus), a South American porcupine species; last recorded in 1925, until its rediscovery in 1989.
- Bouvier's red colobus (Piliocolobus bouvieri), a species of colobus monkey rediscovered in 2015.
- Bridled nail-tail wallaby (Onychogalea fraenata), a vulnerable species of macropod; thought to be extinct since the last confirmed sighting in 1937, but rediscovered in 1973.
- Caspian horse (Equus ferus caballus), previously only known from remains dating back to 3400 BC and Persian art, rediscovered in 1965.
- Central rock rat (Zyzomys pedunculatus), thought to be extinct in 1990, until it was rediscovered in 2001, then the species went unrecorded until 2013.
- Chacoan pygmy opossum (Chacodelphys formosa), known from one specimen collected in the Chaco of Formosa Province, Argentina, until its rediscovery in 2004.
- Cuban solenodon (Atopogale cubana), thought to have been extinct until a live specimen was found in 2003.
- De Winton's golden mole (Cryptochloris wintoni), last seen in western South Africa in 1937 until being rediscovered in 2023.
- Dinagat bushy-tailed cloud rat (Crateromys australis), assumed extinct after discovery in 1974, but rediscovered in 2012.
- Du Chaillu's rope squirrel (Funisciurus duchaillui), listed as extinct in 1952, but was then rediscovered in 1993.
- Eastern black crested gibbon (Nomascus nasutus), presumed extinct after no sightings after the 1960s, but rediscovered in 2002.
- Egyptian population of spotted hyena (Crocuta crocuta), presumed to have been extirpated 5000 years ago like most sub-Saharan fauna due to climate change, rediscovered in 2024
- Fernandina rice rat (Nesoryzomys fernandinae), thought extinct in 1996 (last seen 1980) but found again in the late 1990s.
- Flat-headed myotis (Myotis planiceps), rediscovered in 2004.
- Gilbert's potoroo (Potorous gilbertii), extremely rare Australian mammal presumed extinct from the 19th century until 1994.
- Heavy-browed mouse opossum (Marmosa andersoni), known from a single individual collected in 1954, until its rediscovery in 1997.
- Hills' horseshoe bat (Rhinolophus hillorum), a rare species of bat in the family Rhinolophidae last seen in 1981, rediscovered in 2022.
- Hispid hare (Caprolagus hispidus), rediscovered in 1971.
- Humboldt marten (Martes caurina humboldtensis), subspecies of the Pacific marten thought to be extinct until rediscovered in 1996 on remote camera traps in the Six Rivers National Forest in northern California.
- Juan Fernández fur seal, believed to be extinct until 200 individuals were found on the Juan Fernández islands in the 1960s.
- Julia Creek dunnart (Sminthopsis douglasi), thought to be extinct until it was rediscovered in the 1990s.
- Leadbeater's possum (Gymnobelideus leadbeateri), thought to be extinct until 1965.
- Machu Picchu arboreal chinchilla rat (Cuscomys oblativus), believed extinct since the 1400s or 1500s, but rediscovered in 2009 near Machu Picchu in Peru.
- Mahogany glider (Petaurus gracilis), described in 1883 and not formally recorded between 1886 and 1989. An expedition by the Queensland Museum in 1989 found a living population.
- Miller's langur (Presbytis canicrus), presumed extinct 2004, rediscovered 2012.
- New Guinea big-eared bat (Pharotis imogene), previously, the species was believed to have been extinct since 1890, when it was last spotted. In 2012, researchers realised that a female bat collected near Kamali was a member of this species.
- New Holland mouse (Pseudomys novaehollandiae), described by George Waterhouse in 1843, it was re-discovered in Ku-ring-gai Chase National Park, north of Sydney, in 1967.
- Northern bettong (Bettongia tropica), a species of Bettong, last seen in 1932, rediscovered in 1976.
- Northern elephant seal (Mirounga angustirostris), thought to be extinct in 1884, rediscovered on Guadalupe Island in 1892.
- Omilteme cottontail (Sylvilagus insonus), a cottontail rabbit only found in the Mexican state of Guerrero, previously only known from the holotype specimens collected in 1904, rediscovered in 2025.
- Parma wallaby (Notamacropus parma), a species of Wallaby thought to be extinct in 1932, rediscovered in 1965.
- Philippine naked-backed fruit bat (Dobsonia chapmani), in 1996 the species was declared extinct by the IUCN, as none had been sighted since 1964, but the bat was rediscovered in 2000.
- Pinatubo volcano mouse (Apomys sacobianus), known only from a single type specimen in a museum collection, a 2021 paper revealed field surveys in 2011 and 2012 found it to be common in its habitat.
- Pu Hoat muntjac (Muntiacus puhoatensis), last seen in 1929, rediscovered in 1999.
- Red-crested tree-rat (Santamartamys rufodorsalis), recorded from two specimens in Sierra Nevada de Santa Marta range, Colombia in 1898 and 1913; believed extinct until a specimen was photographed in the same location in 2011.
- Riverine rabbit (Bunolagus monticularis), thought extinct in 1947, rediscovered in 1979.
- Roosevelt's muntjac (Muntiacus rooseveltorum), it was re-discovered in Xuan Lien Nature Reserve in Vietnam's Thanh Hoa province in 2014.
- San Quintin kangaroo rat (Dipodoys gravipes), previously seen in 1986, feared extinct until rediscovery in 2017.
- Santiago Galápagos mouse (Nesoryzomys swarthi), thought extinct and last recorded in 1906, but was rediscovered in 1997.
- Seram long-tailed mosaic-tailed rat (Melomys fulgens), known from a single specimen collected 1920, but rediscovered in 2022.
- Short-footed Luzon tree rat (Carpomys melanurus), believed extinct since 1896, but rediscovered in 2008 on Mount Pulag in northern Luzon.
- Sibree's dwarf lemur (Cheirogaleus sibreei), first discovered in 1896, not seen again until 2001, and was confirmed in 2010.
- Somali sengi (Galegeeska revoilii), only recorded from specimens from Somalia prior to 1968, rediscovered in nearby Djibouti in 2020.
- Southern white rhinoceros (Ceratotherium simum simum), thought to be extinct in the late 1800s until a small crash of them was found.
- Strange big-eared brown bat (Histiotus alienus), discovered in 1916, not seen again until 2018.
- Tammar wallaby (Notamacropus eugenii), the mainland Australian subspecies was presumed extinct from 1925 until genetically matched with invasive wallabies in New Zealand in 1998.
- Tate's triok (Dactylopsila tatei), a species of Triok known from a single specimen collected in 1932, rediscovered 1992.
- Vanzolini's bald-faced saki (Pithecia vanzolinii), first seen in 1937, the species wasn't seen again until it was rediscovered in 2017.
- Van Zyl's golden mole (Cryptochloris zyli), discovered in 1938, rediscovered in 2003.
- Vietnam mouse-deer (Tragulus versicolor), last known from a specimen acquired from hunters in 1990, not seen again for nearly 30 years until multiple individuals were sighted with camera-trap photographs in a 2019 survey of prospective habitat.
- Vogelkop ringtail possum (Pseudochirulus schlegeli), last seen in the 1880's, rediscovered in 1992.
- Wondiwoi tree-kangaroo (Dendrolagus mayri), known from a single specimen from 1928, rediscovered in 2018.
- Woolly flying squirrel (Eupetaurus cinereus), known only from pelts collected in Pakistan in the late 19th century, until live specimens were collected in the 1990s.
- Wimmer's shrew (Crocidura wimmeri), believed extinct since 1976, but rediscovered in 2013 in Côte d'Ivoire.
- Yellow-tailed woolly monkey (Lagothrix flavicauda), first described from furs in 1812, live specimens not discovered until 1926.

=== Reptiles ===
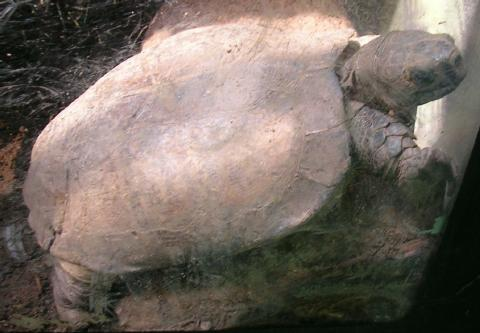
Arakan forest turtle

- Adelaide pygmy blue-tongue skink (Tiliqua adelaidensis), thought to be extinct until one was found in the stomach of an eastern brown snake in 1992 and subsequent search found several populations.
- Albany adder (Bitis albanica), rediscovered in 2016.
- Arakan forest turtle (Heosemys depressa), last seen in 1908 but found again in 1994.
- Barbados threadsnake, once declared "lost to science" and not seen since the late 1990s, was rediscovered in 2025.
- Blyde River flat gecko (Afroedura rondavelica), first discovered in 1991 in Three Rondavels. It was rediscovered in 2025
- Burmese roofed turtle (Batagur trivittata), believed to be extinct in the 1990s until its rediscovery in 2001.
- Clarión night snake (Hypsiglena unaocularus), not seen since its discovery in 1936, rediscovered in 2013.
- Cropan's boa (Corallus cropanii), endemic to the endangered Atlantic forest ecosystem of Brazil, rediscovered in 2017.
- El Hierro giant lizard (Gallotia simonyi), rediscovered in 1974.
- Fernandina Island Galápagos tortoise (Chelonoidis phantasticus), only known from a single male specimen in 1906 and putative droppings and bite marks throughout the 20th century up to the 2010s. A female individual was rediscovered on the island on an expedition in 2019 for the Animal Planet show Extinct or Alive.
- Floreana giant tortoise (Chelonoidis niger niger), initially driven to extinction by 1850 due to overexploitation and introduction of invasive species. In 2012, several hybrids between the subspecies with Volcán Wolf giant tortoises were discovered on Isabela Island, allowing for a revival of the subspecies through backbreeding.
- Gray's monitor (Varanus olivaceus), described in 1845, and not seen again by scientists for 130 years.
- Haensch's whorltail iguana (Stenocercus haenschi), last seen in 1899, but rediscovered in 2021.
- Horned anole (Anolis proboscis), first seen in 1953 and described in 1956, it was thought to have gone extinct until its rediscovery in 2004.
- La Gomera giant lizard (Gallotia bravoana), rediscovered in 1999.
- La Palma giant lizard (Gallotia auaritae), thought to have been extinct since 1500, but rediscovered in 2007.
- Long-toed forest skink (Sphenomorphus anomalopus), thought to be extinct after 1915, rediscovered in 2025.
- Lyon's snake-eyed skink (Austroablepharus barrylyoni), thought to have been extinct since 1981, but rediscovered in 2023.
- New Caledonian crested gecko (Correlophus ciliatus) rediscovered in 1994.
- New Ireland monitor (Varanus douarrha), described in 1830, feared extinct until rediscovery in 2017
- Peter's ameiva (Holcosus orcesi), last seen in 1959, but rediscovered in 2021.
- Rio Apaporis caiman (Caiman crocodilus apaporiensis), believed to have become extinct by 1981, when the last known specimen died in a zoo. However, a specimen was captured in an expedition by Colombian conservation biologist Sergio Balaguera-Reina in 2018.
- Saint Lucia Racer (Erythrolamprus ornatus), rediscovered in 1973 after not being seen for 37 years.
- Short-nosed sea snake (Aipysurus apraefrontalis), rediscovered in 2015, after parting with their original habitat of the Ashmore and Cartier Islands for unknown reasons.
- Southern river terrapin (Batagur affinis), thought to have disappeared from Cambodia until it was rediscovered in 2001.
- Terror skink (Phoboscincus bocourti), a 50-cm-long lizard, was previously known from a single specimen captured around 1870 and was long presumed extinct. In 2003, on a tiny islet, it was rediscovered.
- Voeltzkow's chameleon (Furcifer voeltzkowi), rediscovered in 2018, having last been seen in 1893.
- Victorian grassland bearded dragon (Tympanocryptis pinguicolla), feared extinct since 1969, rediscovered in 2023.

=== Birds ===
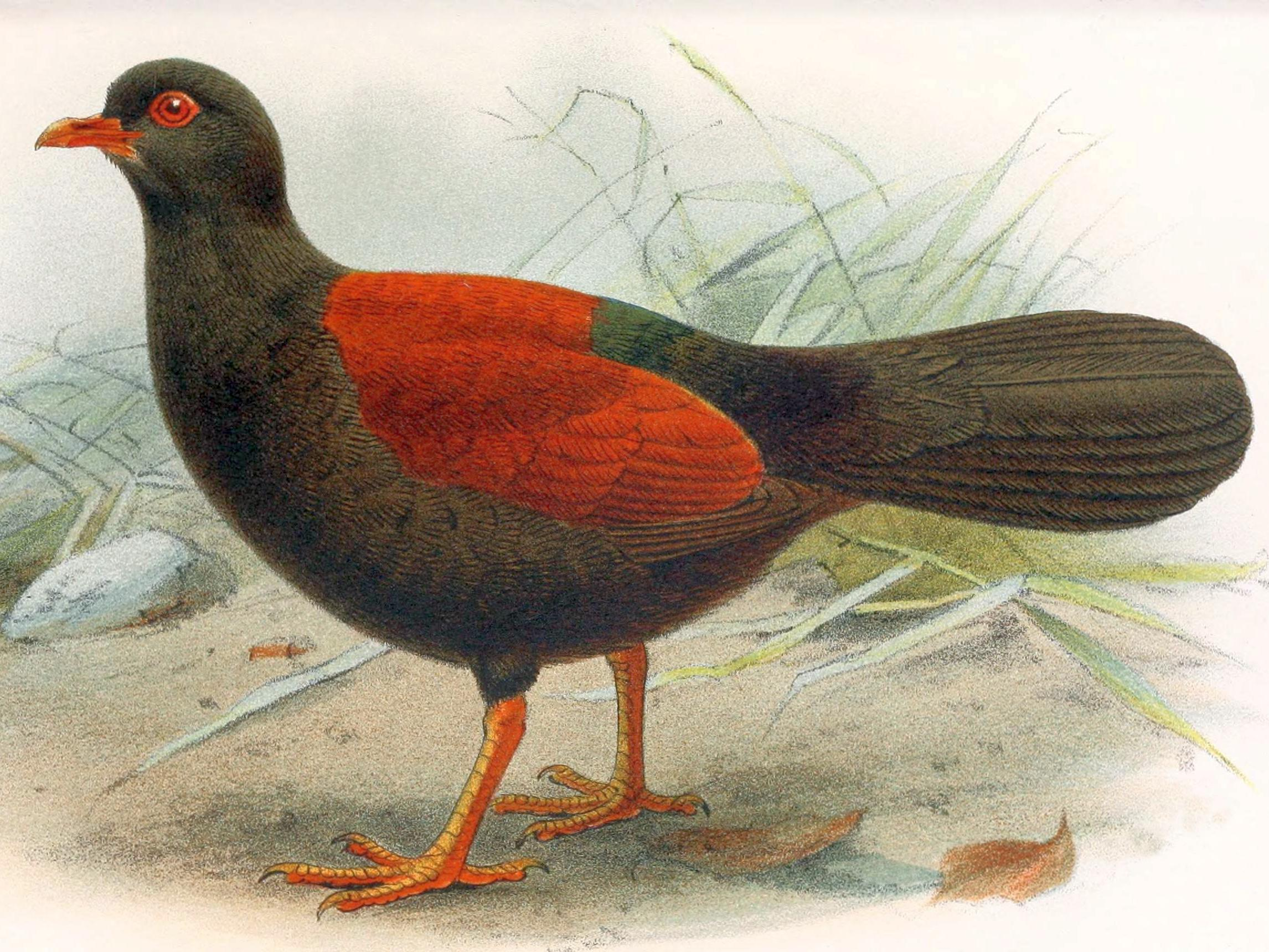
Black-naped pheasant pigeon, also known as Auwo

- Anambra waxbill (Estrilda poliopareia), last seen in 1987, rediscovered in 2002.
- Anjouan sparrowhawk (Tachyspiza francesiae pusillus), thought to be extinct by 1965 until it was rediscovered in 2005.
- Antioquia brushfinch (Atlapetes blancae), collected in the 20th century, rediscovered in 2018.
- Azores bullfinch (Pyrrhula murina), thought to be extinct from 1932 to 1967.
- Bahia tapaculo (Eleoscytalopus psychopompus), known from only three specimens in 1990s, found again in 2010s.
- Banggai crow (Corvus unicolor), not recorded since 1884/1885, confirmed with a photograph in 2008.
- Beck's petrel (Pseudobulweria beckii), not seen between 1929 and 2007.
- Belem curassow (Crax fasciolata pinima), last seen in 1978, rediscovered in 2017 in the Gurupi Biological Reserve of Brazil.
- Berlepsch's parotia (Parotia berlepschi), known only from four specimen 1985, rediscovered in 2005.
- Bermuda petrel or "cahow" (Pterodroma cahow), thought extinct since 1620 until 18 nesting pairs were found in 1951 on an uninhabited rock outcropping in Bermuda. Bermudian David B. Wingate has devoted his life to bringing the birds back, and in the 2011—12 breeding season they passed 100-pairs.
- Bismarck kingfisher (Ceyx websteri), last seen in 2012, rediscovered in Papua New Guinea's Bismarck Archipelago in 2025
- Black-browed babbler (Malacocincla perspicillata), rediscovered in 2020
- Black-lored waxbill (Estrilda nigriloris), last seen in 1950, rediscovered in 2023.
- Black-naped pheasant pigeon (Otidiphaps nobilis insularis), only seen once in 1882 and was only known from artwork and the holotype specimen, rediscovered in 2022 on Fergusson Island.
- Black-tailed cisticola (Cisticola melanurus), last seen in 2010, rediscovered in 2024.
- Blue-bearded helmetcrest (Oxypogon cyanolaemus), feared extinct after no sightings after 1946, rediscovered in 2015.
- Blue-eyed ground dove (Columbina cyanopis), last seen in 2007, rediscovered in 2015.
- Bolivian recurvebill (Syndactyla striata), last documented in 1935, rediscovered in 1989.
- Bougainville thicketbird (Cincloramphus llaneae), last documented in 2002, before being rediscovered in 2024.
- Bruijn's brush-turkey (Aepypodius bruijnii), relocated in 2002.
- Cape Verde warbler (Acrocephalus brevipennis), last observed in 1970, rediscovered in 1998.
- Cebu flowerpecker (Dicaeum quadricolor), Feared to have become extinct early in the 20th century, it was rediscovered in 1992 in a small patch of limestone forest in the Central Cebu Protected Landscape.
- Chinese crested tern (Thalasseus bernsteini), feared extinct in the mid-late 20th century for over 6 decades until a small breeding colony was found in 2000.
- Cone-billed tanager (Conothraupis mesoleuca), feared extinct after no sightings after 1983, but rediscovered in a gallery forest in Emas National Park in 2003.
- Crow honeyeater (Gymnomyza aubryana), rediscovered in 2011.
- Cuban kite (Chondrohierax wilsonii), confirmed with a photograph in 2009.
- Dusky starfrontlet (Coeligena orina), not seen until the rediscovery in 2004.
- Dusky tetraka (Crossleyia tenebrosa), last documented sighting was in 1999, rediscovered in 2022.
- Edwards's pheasant (Lophura edwardii), a Vietnamese pheasant presumed extinct from 1928 until it was rediscovered in 1998.
- Fiji petrel (Pseudobulweria macgillivrayi), first rediscovered on land in 1983, and at sea in 2009.
- Flores scops owl (Otus alfredi), last seen in 1896, rediscovered in 1994.
- Forest owlet (Heteroglaux blewitti), assumed extinct in the 19th century, but rediscovered in central India in 1997.
- Giant ibis (Thaumatibis gigantea), last seen in 1962 and feared extinct soon after, rediscovered in 1993.
- Gilliard's honeyeater (Vosea whitemanensis), first discovered in 1958, seen again in 1979, only to disappear again until 1999, not seen again until 2023.
- Golden-fronted bowerbird (Amblyornis flavifrons), Originally described in 1895 based on trade skins, remained a mystery for nearly a hundred years, until 31 January 1981 when the American ornithologist Jared Diamond discovered the home ground at the Foja Mountains in the Papua province of Indonesia. Photographed in December 2005.
- Grey-winged cotinga (Lipaugus conditus), last seen in 1942, rediscovered in 1980.
- Guadalcanal moustached kingfisher (Actenoides bougainvillei excelsus), known from three females collected between 1920-1953, until a male a captured in 2015.
- Gurney's pitta (Hydrornis gurneyi), first described in 1875, rediscovered in 1986.
- Jambandu indigobird (Vidua raricola), no sighting of the species after 2008 raised concerns of the species extinction, until it was photographed in Sierra Leone in 2021.
- James's flamingo (Phoenicoparrus jamesi), had been thought to be extinct until a population was discovered in a remote area in 1956.
- Javan blue-banded kingfisher (Alcedo euryzona), not seen since 1937 raised concerns of the species extinction, until it was rediscovered in 2009.
- Jerdon's courser (Rhinoptilus bitorquatus), a wader from India, assumed extinct until 1986.
- Kaempfer's woodpecker (Celeus obrieni), a Brazilian woodpecker feared extinct after no specimen had been found since its discovery in 1926. Rediscovered in 2006.
- Kangean tit-babbler (Mixornis prillwitzi), last documented in 2010, rediscovered in 2023.
- Large-billed reed-warbler (Acrocephalus orinus), a warbler rediscovered in Thailand in 2006, previous known only from a specimen collected in India in 1867.
- Long-billed bush warbler (Locustella major), last documented in Kashmir in 1977, rediscovered in 2022.
- Long-legged warbler (Trichocichla rufa), first collected in 1890 and four specimens were collected between then and 1894, after which the species was not seen again until 1974.
- Long-whiskered owlet (Xenoglaux loweryi), described from specimens collected in 1976, rediscovered in 2002 by audio recordings, then seen in the wild for the first time in 2007.
- Madagascar serpent eagle (Eutriorchis astur), rediscovered in 1993, sixty years since the previous sighting.
- Madagascar pochard (Aythya innotata), thought extinct since 1991 until a small group were spotted in 2006.
- Magdalena tinamou (Crypturellus erythropus saltuarius), no confirmed sightings after 1943, though locals reported the species until the 1990s, rediscovered in 2023.
- Magenta petrel (Pterodroma magentae), last seen in 1867 and was feared to be extinct, until its rediscovery in 1978.
- Manipur bush quail (Perdicula manipurensis), last seen in 1932, rediscovered in 2006 in Assam.
- Manus dwarf kingfisher (Ceyx dispar), no records of the species from 2002 until 2022.
- Mayr's honeyeater (Ptiloprora mayri), last seen in 2008, rediscovered in June 2023 when a pair was spotted in Cyclops Mountains.
- Mindoro bleeding heart (Gallicolumba platenae), last seen and photographed in 2005, rediscovered in northern Mindoro in 2026.
- Mussau triller (Lalage conjuncta), last documented in 1979, rediscovered in 2024 and was photographed for the first time.
- Myanmar Jerdon's babbler (Chrysomma altirostre altirostre), last seen in 1941, rediscovered in 2015.
- New Britain bronzewing (Henicophaps foersteri), last documented in 1972, rediscovered when it was photographed in on June 6, 2026.
- New Britain goshawk (Tachyspiza princeps), last documented in 1969, until it was photographed in 2024.
- New Britain thrush (Zoothera talaseae), last documented in 1999, rediscovered in 2024 when a single bird tripped a camera trap.
- New Zealand storm-petrel (Oceanites maorianus), believed extinct from 1850 but sighted again in 2003.
- Night parrot (Pezoporus occidentalis), extremely rare Australian bird presumed extinct from the 1880s until 1990.
- Noisy scrub-bird (Atrichornis clamosus), presumed extinct when searched unsuccessfully at Ellensbrook in 1920, rediscovered after 75 years.
- Orange-necked partridge (Arborophila davidi), described and collected once in 1927, rediscovered in 1991 in Cát Tiên National Park.
- Omani owl (Strix butleri), described and last seen in 1873, rediscovered in 2015.
- Peruvian solitaire (Cichlopsis leucogenys peruviana), no documented records after 2013 until its rediscovery in 2024.
- Pohnpei starling (Aplonis pelzelni), last seen in 1956 when ornithologist Joe T. Marshall shot two specimens on Pohnpei, rediscovered in 1995 when a female was shot during a herpetological expedition.
- Red Owl (Tyto soumagnei), last seen in 1876, until its rediscovery by the World Wide Fund for Nature in 1993.
- Rossel cicadabird (Edolisoma rostratum), last seen in 1898, rediscovered in 2014.
- Rufous-breasted blue flycatcher (Cyornis camarinensis), rediscovered in 2025 after being feared extinct for 17 years. It is considered one of Philippines least documented birds.
- Rufous-fronted antthrush (Formicarius rufifrons), known from a few specimens collected in 1955 and later described in 1957, rediscovered in 1983.
- Rusty bush lark (Calendulauda rufa), last seen in May 1931 near Tahoua, Niger, rediscovered in the province of Guéra in Chad on February 2, 2026.
- Rusty thicketbird (Cincloramphus rubiginosus), last seen in 2009, later rediscovered in 2023.
- Sangihe scops owl (Otus collari), last seen in 1867, rediscovered in 1985.
- Santa Marta sabrewing (Campylopterus phainopeplus), last seen in 1946, later rediscovered in 2010 before going missing for another 12 years and was rediscovered in 2022.
- Salvadori's pheasant (Lophura inornata), last seen in 1950, rediscovered in 1980.
- São Tomé fiscal (Lanius newtoni), there were records of sightings in 1888 and again in 1928. Another individual was sighted in 1990.
- São Tomé grosbeak (Neospiza concolor), known only from three nineteenth-century specimens. It was rediscovered in 1991.
- São Tomé ibis (Bostrychia bocagei), last recorded in 1928, rediscovered in 1990.
- Satanic nightjar (Eurostopodus diabolicus), discovered in 1931, only known from a few unconfirmed reports until it was identified in 1996 in Lore Lindu National Park.
- Selva cacique (Cacicus koepckeae), last seen in 1965, rediscovered in 1998.
- Short-tailed albatross (Phoebastria albatrus), assumed to be extinct and research became impossible with the outbreak of World War II. Rediscovered in 1949.
- Sillem's rosefinch (Carpodacus sillemi), last seen in 1929, photographed in 2012.
- Silvery pigeon (Columba argentina), confirmed photographically in 2008.
- Sira barbet (Capito fitzpatricki), formally described in 2012, rediscovered in 2024.
- Sira curassow (Pauxi koepckeae), known from only two specimens collected in 1969, rediscovered in 2000.
- Sumatran ground cuckoo (Carpococcyx viridis), known from eight specimens and was last seen in 1916, rediscovered in 1997.
- Táchira antpitta (Grallaria chthonia), a Venezuelan antpitta feared extinct since its discovery in 1956, but rediscovered in 2017 in El Tamá National Park.
- Takahē (Porphyrio hochstetteri), assumed extinct in 1898 but found again in 1948.
- Togo yellow-billed barbet (Trachylaemus goffinii togoensis), no documented sightings between 2011 and 2022.
- Unicolored thrush (Turdus haplochrous), no sightings between 2013 and 2024.
- Urich's tyrannulet (Phyllomyias urichi), feared extinct in the 1940s until it was rediscovered in 2005, disappeared again until it was rediscovered again in 2021.
- Vanuatu petrel (Pterodroma occulta), known from six specimens caught off of Merelava, Vanuatu, rediscovered in 1983 from a single bird washed ashore in New South Wales, Australia.
- Vilcabamba Inca (Coeligena torquata eisenmanni ), last seen in 1967, rediscovered in 2024.
- Wetar ground dove (Pampusana hoedtii), last seen in 1900, rediscovered in 2008.
- White-collared kite (Leptodon forbesi), last seen in 1880, rediscovered in 1987.
- White-headed barbet (Lybius leucocephalus), last recorded in 1971, rediscovered in 2017.
- White-winged guan (Penelope albipennis), known from three specimens collected in 1876 and 1877. It was not positively seen again until 1977.
- White-winged potoo (Nyctibius leucopterus), last seen in 1817, rediscovered in 1985.
- White-tailed tityra (Tityra leucura), feared extinct after there were no sightings of the species after 1829, rediscovered almost 200 years later in 2006 near the Madeira River.
- Yellow-crested helmetshrike (Ognorhynchus icterotis), considered a lost species after not being seen since 2008, rediscovered in 2023 in the Itombwe Mountains.
- Yellow-throated seedeater (Crithagra flavigula), last recorded in 1886, rediscovered in Ethiopia in 1989.
- Zapata rail (Cyanolimnas cerverai), easily found in the Santo Tomás area until 1931, but there were no further records until the 1970s.
- Zebra woodpecker (Meiglyptes tristis), last seen in 1880, rediscovered in 2010.

=== Molluscs ===
- Aldabra banded snail (Rhachistia aldabrae), declared extinct in 1994, but rediscovered in 2014 on Malabar Island in the Seychelles.
- Cobble elimia (Elimia vanuxemiana), last seen in the 1950s or 1960s but rediscovered in 2005.
- Discus guerinianus, a Madeiran land snail thought extinct in 1996 but found again in 1999.
- False spike (Fusconaia mitchelli), last seen in 1975, rediscovered in 2011 in the Guadalupe River near Gonzales, Texas.
- Georgia pigtoe (Pleurobema hanleyianum), rediscovered in 2003 after being listed as extinct by the IUCN in the Conasauga River in Georgia and Tennessee.
- Greater Bermuda land snail (Poecilozonites bermudensis), last recorded sighting made in the early 1970s, rediscovered in City of Hamilton alleyway in 2014.
- Lesser Bermuda land snail (Poecilozonites circumfirmatus), last recorded sighting made in the early 1970s, rediscovered in 2002 found a clutch of survivors in Gould's old sites. Several dozen snails were sent to London to aid their propagation.
- Oblong rocksnail (Leptoxis compacta), not seen since 1933 and declared extinct in 2000, rediscovered in 2011.
- Ochlockonee moccasinshell (Medionidus simpsonianus), last seen in 1993, rediscovered in 2007.
- Omphalotropis plicosa, last seen in 1878, rediscovered in 2002.
- Recovery pearly mussel (Elliptio nigella), considered extinct in 1986, rediscovered in 2010.
- Suwannee moccasinshell (Medionidus walkeri), last seen in 1994, rediscovered in 2012.
- Teardrop elimia (Elimia lachryma), last seen in the 1950s or 1960s but rediscovered in 2005

== See also ==
- List of fossil sites (with link directory)
- Lists of extinct animals
- List of megafauna discovered in modern times
- Rare species
- Signor–Lipps effect
- Transitional fossil
- Romeo error
