= Chiretolpis xanthomelas =

Scientific classification
- Kingdom: Animalia
- Phylum: Arthropoda
- Class: Insecta
- Order: Lepidoptera
- Superfamily: Noctuoidea
- Family: Erebidae
- Subfamily: Arctiinae
- Genus: Chiretolpis
- Species: C. xanthomelas

Binomial name
- Chiretolpis xanthomelas (Hampson, 1900)

Synonyms
- Tricholepis xanthomelas Hampson, 1900; Tricholepis keensis Strand, 1922; Tricholepis nigrita Rothschild & Jordan, 1901

Species of moth

Chiretolpis xanthomelas is a moth of the family Erebidae. It is found on the Tanimbar Islands.
