= Red-tailed soil-crevice skink =

Conservation status
- Least Concern (IUCN 3.1)

Scientific classification
- Kingdom: Animalia
- Phylum: Chordata
- Class: Reptilia
- Order: Squamata
- Family: Scincidae
- Genus: Austroablepharus
- Species: A. kinghorni

Binomial name
- Austroablepharus kinghorni (Copland, 1947)

Synonyms
- Ablepharus kinghorni Copland, 1947; Proablepharus kinghorni (Copland, 1947)

Species of lizard

The red-tailed soil-crevice skink (Austroablepharus kinghorni), also known commonly as Kinghorn's grassland striped skink and Kinghorn's snake-eyed skink, is a species of skink, a lizard in the subfamily Eugongylinae of the family Scincidae. The species is endemic to Australia.

== Etymology ==
The specific name, kinghorni, is in honour of Australian herpetologist James Roy Kinghorn.

== Description ==
A. kinghorni may attain a snout-to-vent length (SVL) of 4.5 cm (1.8 in). Dorsally, it is tan or greyish, with dark brown spots forming lines that may be indistinct. Ventrally, it is tan or greyish. The tail is red, either dull or bright. The interparietal scale is not fused to the frontoparietals.

== Geographic range ==
A. kinghorni is found in the Australian states of New South Wales and Queensland, and in the Northern Territory.

== Habitat ==
The preferred natural habitat of A. kinghorni is tussock grassland with cracking soil.

== Reproduction ==
A. kinghorni is oviparous.
