= Rhaphidospora =

Scientific classification
- Kingdom: Plantae
- Clade: Tracheophytes
- Clade: Angiosperms
- Clade: Eudicots
- Clade: Asterids
- Order: Lamiales
- Family: Acanthaceae
- Genus: Rhaphidospora; Nees

Genus of plants

Rhaphidospora is a genus of flowering plants belonging to the family Acanthaceae. A classification of the Acanthaceae published in 2022 treats Rhaphidospora as a synonym of Justicia.

Its native range is Tropical and Southern Africa, Madagascar, Tropical Asia to Eastern Australia.

Species:

- Rhaphidospora bonneyana (F.Muell.) R.M.Barker
- Rhaphidospora cavernarum (F.Muell.) R.M.Barker
- Rhaphidospora javanica Bremek.
- Rhaphidospora luzonensis (C.B.Clarke) Bremek.
- Rhaphidospora medullosa Bremek.
- Rhaphidospora membranifolia Miq.
- Rhaphidospora novoguineensis Valeton
- Rhaphidospora platyphylla (S.Moore) Bremek. ex A.R.Bean
