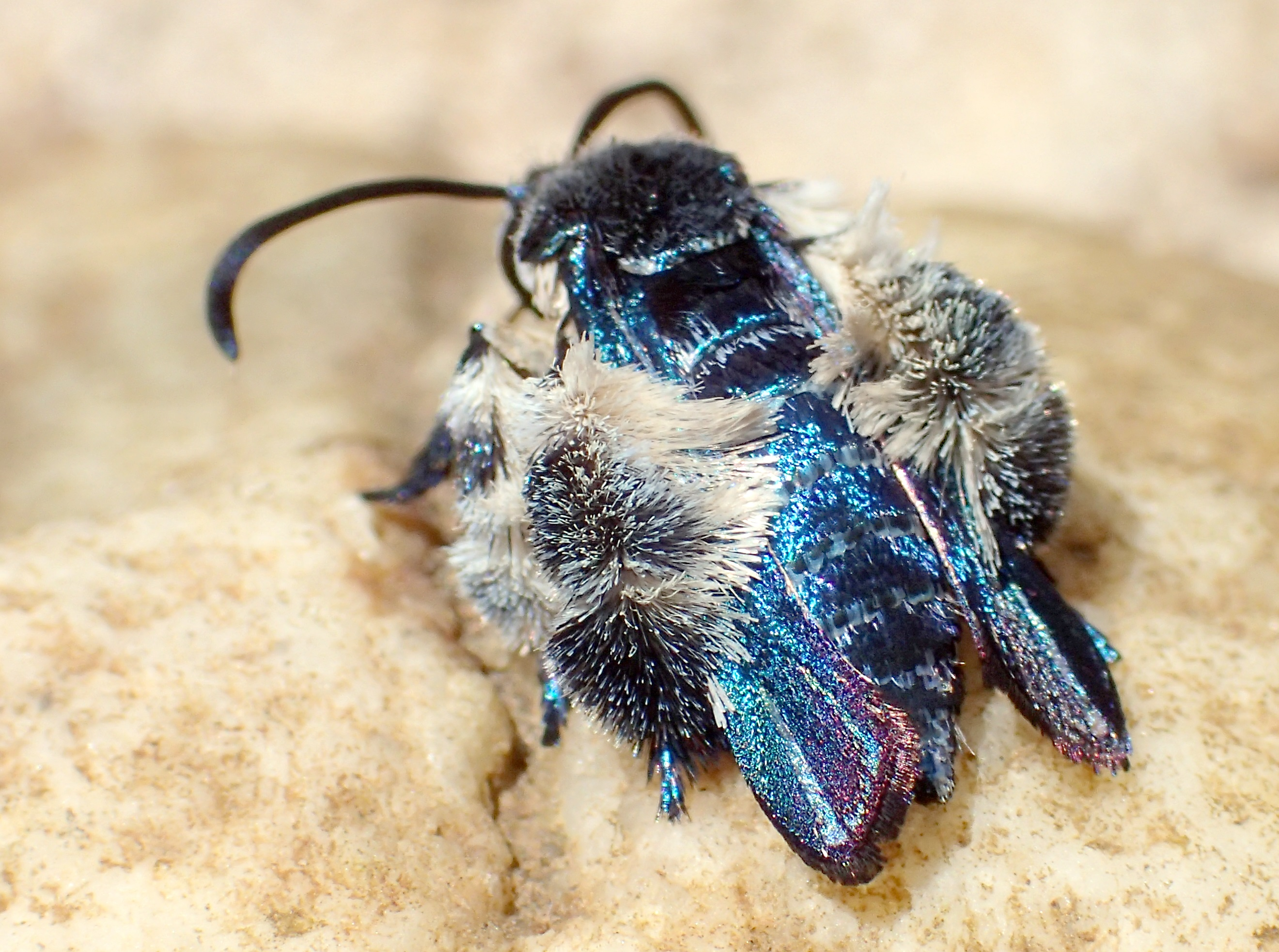
- Heterosphecia tawonoides

Scientific classification
- Domain: Eukaryota
- Kingdom: Animalia
- Phylum: Arthropoda
- Class: Insecta
- Order: Lepidoptera
- Family: Sesiidae
- Tribe: Osminiini
- Genus: Heterosphecia; Le Cerf, 1916

Species
- See text

= Heterosphecia =

Genus of moths

Heterosphecia is a genus of moths in the family Sesiidae which is found from Borneo, Sumatra and South India. There are eight known species with few records, so consequently their conservation status is unknown.

== Species ==
- Heterosphecia bantanakai (Arita & Gorbunov, 2000)
- Heterosphecia hyaloptera (Hampson, 1919)
- Heterosphecia indica Kallies, 2003
- Heterosphecia melissoides (Hampson, [1893])
- Heterosphecia robinsoni Kallies, 2003
- Heterosphecia soljanikovi (Gorbunov, 1988)
- Heterosphecia tawonoides Kallies, 2003
