= Chiretolpis woodlarkiana =

Scientific classification
- Kingdom: Animalia
- Phylum: Arthropoda
- Class: Insecta
- Order: Lepidoptera
- Superfamily: Noctuoidea
- Family: Erebidae
- Subfamily: Arctiinae
- Genus: Chiretolpis
- Species: C. woodlarkiana

Binomial name
- Chiretolpis woodlarkiana (Rothschild & Jordan, 1901)

Synonyms
- Trichocerosia woodlarkiana Rothschild & Jordan, 1901

Species of moth

Chiretolpis woodlarkiana is a moth of the family Erebidae.

It is endemic to the Woodlark Islands of the Solomon Sea in Papua New Guinea.
