= Chiretolpis melanoxantha =

Scientific classification
- Kingdom: Animalia
- Phylum: Arthropoda
- Class: Insecta
- Order: Lepidoptera
- Superfamily: Noctuoidea
- Family: Erebidae
- Subfamily: Arctiinae
- Genus: Chiretolpis
- Species: C. melanoxantha

Binomial name
- Chiretolpis melanoxantha (Hampson, 1911)

Synonyms
- Tricholepis melanoxantha Hampson, 1911

Species of moth

Chiretolpis melanoxantha is a moth of the family Erebidae. It is found on the Moluccas.
