= Orange-tailed snake-eyed skink =

Conservation status
- Least Concern (IUCN 3.1)

Scientific classification
- Kingdom: Animalia
- Phylum: Chordata
- Class: Reptilia
- Order: Squamata
- Family: Scincidae
- Genus: Austroablepharus
- Species: A. naranjicauda

Binomial name
- Austroablepharus naranjicauda Greer, Fisher, & Horner, 2004

Synonyms
- Proablepharus naranjicaudus

Species of lizard

The orange-tailed snake-eyed skink (Austroablepharus naranjicauda) is a species of skink, a lizard in the family Scincidae. The species is endemic to the Northern Territory in Australia.
