= Chiretolpis ochracea =

Scientific classification
- Domain: Eukaryota
- Kingdom: Animalia
- Phylum: Arthropoda
- Class: Insecta
- Order: Lepidoptera
- Superfamily: Noctuoidea
- Family: Erebidae
- Subfamily: Arctiinae
- Genus: Chiretolpis
- Species: C. ochracea

Binomial name
- Chiretolpis ochracea (Rothschild & Jordan, 1901)

Synonyms
- Tricholepis ochracea Rothschild & Jordan, 1901; Tricholepis postdivisa Rothschild, 1916

Species of moth

Chiretolpis ochracea is a moth of the family Erebidae first described by Rothschild and Jordan in 1901. It is found in New Guinea.
