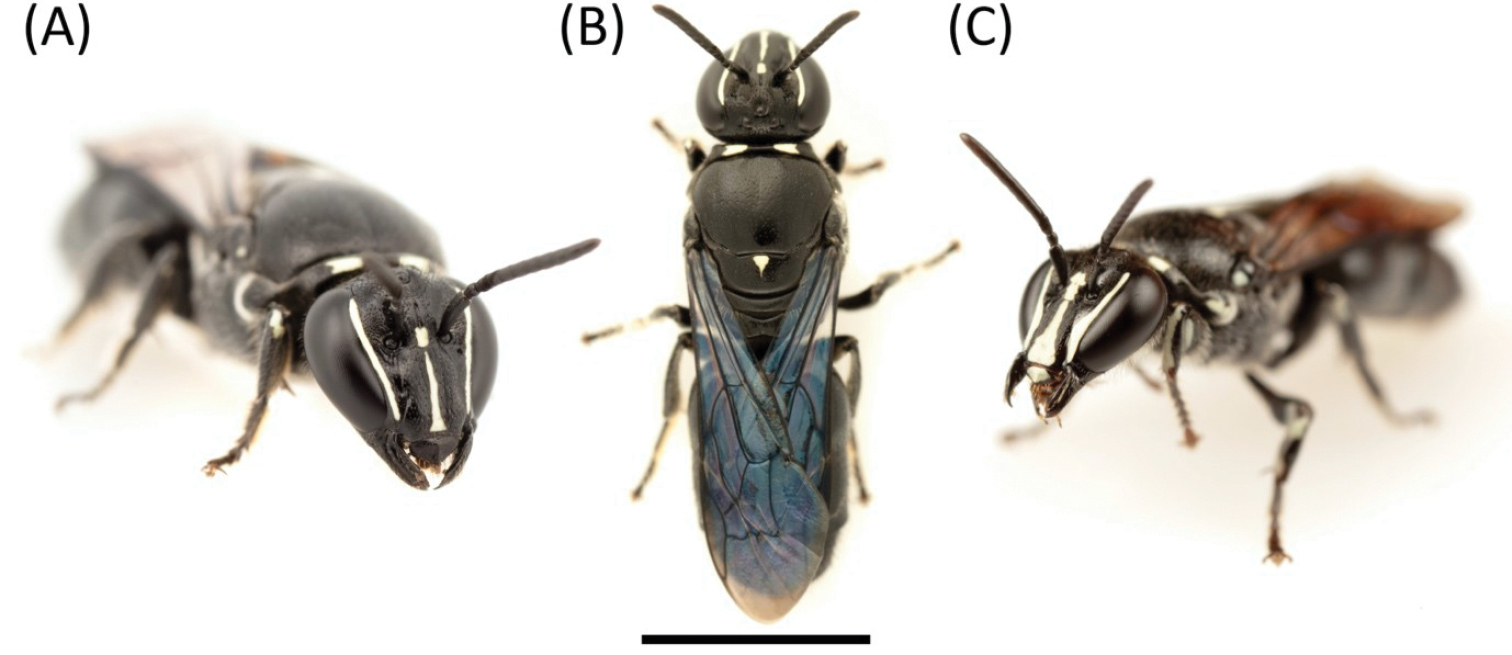
- female

Scientific classification
- Kingdom: Animalia
- Phylum: Arthropoda
- Clade: Pancrustacea
- Class: Insecta
- Order: Hymenoptera
- Family: Colletidae
- Genus: Hylaeus
- Species: H. lactiferus

Binomial name
- Hylaeus lactiferus (Cockerell, 1910)

Synonyms
- Pharohylaeus lactiferus Cockerell, 1910

= Hylaeus lactiferus =

Cloaked bee

Species of bee

Hylaeus lactiferus, the cloaked bee, is a rare species of bee native to tropical and subtropical forests in northeast Australia. The species is an example of a Lazarus taxon, with no reliable records published between 1923 and its rediscovery in 2008.

== Description ==
The cloaked bee is relatively large, with its stout body measuring 9 to 11 mm (0.35 to 0.43 in) in length. Its body is mostly black with distinctive white markings on its face and thorax. Not much is known about the biology or behavior of the species.

== Distribution and habitat ==
All documented sightings of the cloaked bee originate from subtropical and tropical forests in northeast Australia. Specimens were first collected in the Atherton Tablelands, Mackay, and Kuranda, though the exact locations were "imprecise."

== Discovery and rediscovery ==
Hylaeus lactiferus was first described by Theodore Dru Alison Cockerell in 1910 and given the common name "cloaked bee". Following the collection of three male specimens in January 1923, the species would not be spotted for over 80 years.

In 2008, the species would be rediscovered by James B. Dorey, who collected a female specimen resting on foliage as well as five male specimens patrolling the flowers of a firewheel tree.
