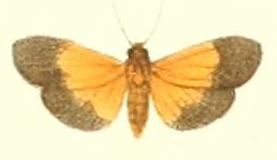
- Chiretolpis bicolorata

Scientific classification
- Domain: Eukaryota
- Kingdom: Animalia
- Phylum: Arthropoda
- Class: Insecta
- Order: Lepidoptera
- Superfamily: Noctuoidea
- Family: Erebidae
- Subfamily: Arctiinae
- Tribe: Lithosiini
- Subtribe: Nudariina
- Genus: Chiretolpis; Watson, 1980

Synonyms
- Tricholepis Hampson, 1891; Trichocerosia Hampson, 1900

= Chiretolpis =

Genus of moths

Chiretolpis is a genus of moths in the family Erebidae.

== Description ==
Palpi very minute. Antennae ciliated in both sexes, but long in male than female. Abdomen of female with a large anal tuft. Wings covered with hair like scales. Forewings long, apex produced and rounded. Outer margin very oblique. Veins 7 to 9 stalked and vein 11 anastomosing with vein 12. Hindwings with vein 3 arise from before angle of cell, vein 5 from above angle, veins 6 and 7 stalked and vein 8 from beyond middle of cell.

== Species ==
- Chiretolpis atrifulva
- Chiretolpis bicolorata (Pagenstecher, 1900)
- Chiretolpis elongata
- Chiretolpis erubescens
- Chiretolpis melanoxantha
- Chiretolpis ochracea
- Chiretolpis rhodia
- Chiretolpis signata
- Chiretolpis sinapis
- Chiretolpis unicolor
- Chiretolpis woodlarkiana
- Chiretolpis xanthomelas
