= Austroablepharus =

Scientific classification
- Kingdom: Animalia
- Phylum: Chordata
- Class: Reptilia
- Order: Squamata
- Family: Scincidae
- Subfamily: Eugongylinae
- Genus: Austroablepharus

Genus of lizards

Austroablepharus is a genus of skinks endemic to Australia.

== Species ==
Three species are recognized.

- Austroablepharus barrylyoni Couper et al., 2010 – Lyon's snake-eyed skink
- Austroablepharus kinghorni (Copland, 1947) – red-tailed soil-crevice skink
- Austroablepharus naranjicauda Greer, Fisher & Horner, 2004 – orange-tailed snake-eyed skink
