= Calliostoma bullatum =

Calliostoma bullatum Temporal range: Early Pleistocene–Present

Scientific classification
- Kingdom: Animalia
- Phylum: Mollusca
- Class: Gastropoda
- Subclass: Vetigastropoda
- Order: Trochida
- Family: Calliostomatidae
- Genus: Calliostoma
- Species: C. bullatum

Binomial name
- Calliostoma bullatum Philippi, 1844

Synonyms
- † Trochus bullatus Philippi, 1844

Species of sea snail

Calliostoma bullatum is a species of sea snail, a marine gastropod mollusk in the family Calliostomatidae.

== Distribution ==
Fossil evidence indicates that this species formerly lived as far north as what is now the Mediterranean Sea, but presently it is only known from abyssal habitats off the coast of West Africa, where it largely lives among deep-water coral reefs.

== Description and rediscovery ==
This species is notable for being described as a fossil well before live individuals were found. The species was originally described from fossil specimens from early-mid Pleistocene outcrops in southern Italy. After over a century, live individuals were found in deepwater reefs off the coast of Mauritania. This makes C. bullatum an example of a fossil Lazarus taxon.
