= Chiretolpis signata =

Scientific classification
- Domain: Eukaryota
- Kingdom: Animalia
- Phylum: Arthropoda
- Class: Insecta
- Order: Lepidoptera
- Superfamily: Noctuoidea
- Family: Erebidae
- Subfamily: Arctiinae
- Genus: Chiretolpis
- Species: C. signata

Binomial name
- Chiretolpis signata (Rothschild & Jordan, 1901)

Synonyms
- Trichocerosia signata Rothschild & Jordan, 1901

Species of moth

Chiretolpis signata is a moth of the subfamily Arctiinae. It is found on the Louisiade Archipelago.
