= Chiretolpis atrifulva =

Scientific classification
- Kingdom: Animalia
- Phylum: Arthropoda
- Class: Insecta
- Order: Lepidoptera
- Superfamily: Noctuoidea
- Family: Erebidae
- Subfamily: Arctiinae
- Genus: Chiretolpis
- Species: C. atrifulva

Binomial name
- Chiretolpis atrifulva (Hampson, 1900)

Synonyms
- Trichocerosia atrifulva Hampson, 1900; Zygaenosia nigrorufa Rothschild, 1913

Species of moth

Chiretolpis atrifulva is a moth of the family Erebidae. It is found in New Guinea.
