= Romeo error =

Concept in conservation biology

In conservation biology, Romeo error is a term used to refer to a scenario in which an extant species is prematurely declared extinct, and the subsequent decline in conservation efforts results in further population decline or actual extinction. The term was first used in the context of conservation biology in a 1998 paper on the rediscovery of the Cebu flowerpecker (Dicaeum quadricolor).

== Origin and definition ==
The term "Romeo error" was used by writer Lyall Watson in his 1974 book The Romeo Error to refer to instances in which a still living person is declared dead. The term refers to the character Romeo of William Shakespeare's Romeo and Juliet in which Romeo's "error" is that, in incorrectly believing that Juliet has died, he inadvertently causes her actual death.

The term was first used in the context of conservation biology by ornithologist Nigel J. Collar in a 1998 paper in the journal Oryx entitled "Extinction by assumption; or, the Romeo Error on Cebu". The paper discusses the Cebu flowerpecker (Dicaeum quadricolor), a species of bird endemic to the Philippine island of Cebu. The bird had not been seen since 1906, and was widely presumed extinct, until it was later rediscovered in a 2 km^{2} (0.77 sq mi) patch of remnant forest in 1992. Collar argued that by labelling the Cebu flowerpecker as extinct, its extinction became a self-fulfilling prophecy. Collar explains that, had the species not been presumed extinct, conservation measures could have been taken to prevent the deforestation that contributed to its decline.

The term has come to be used by scientists to refer to the positive feedback loop towards extinction caused by premature declarations of a species' extinct status.

== Impact ==
The International Union for the Conservation of Nature's guidelines for using the Red List criteria cautions that species should not be listed as extinct or extinct in the wild if there is any reasonable possibility that they may still be extant, lest assessors commit the Romeo error. As of 2017, the guidelines have allowed assessments to further categorise or "tag" critically endangered species as being possibly extinct or possibly extinct in the wild in hopes of avoiding the Romeo error. This tag may be applied to species that are considered likely to be extinct, but for which there is a small chance that they are still extant.

Committing the Romeo error risks undermining public trust in conservation efforts. Conversely, fear of the Romeo error has been noted to contribute to an underestimation of extinction rates and may risk limited conservation resources being wasted.

== See also ==
- Lazarus taxon, a term applied to species that have been rediscovered after being declared extinct
