= Chiretolpis unicolor =

Scientific classification
- Domain: Eukaryota
- Kingdom: Animalia
- Phylum: Arthropoda
- Class: Insecta
- Order: Lepidoptera
- Superfamily: Noctuoidea
- Family: Erebidae
- Subfamily: Arctiinae
- Genus: Chiretolpis
- Species: C. unicolor

Binomial name
- Chiretolpis unicolor (Rothschild & Jordan, 1901)

Synonyms
- Tricholepis unicolor Rothschild & Jordan, 1901

Species of moth

Chiretolpis unicolor is a moth of the family Erebidae. It is found on Ambon Island.
