= Chiretolpis rhodia =

Scientific classification
- Domain: Eukaryota
- Kingdom: Animalia
- Phylum: Arthropoda
- Class: Insecta
- Order: Lepidoptera
- Superfamily: Noctuoidea
- Family: Erebidae
- Subfamily: Arctiinae
- Genus: Chiretolpis
- Species: C. rhodia

Binomial name
- Chiretolpis rhodia (Rothschild & Jordan, 1901)

Synonyms
- Tricholepis rhodia Rothschild & Jordan, 1901

Species of moth

Chiretolpis rhodia is a moth of the family Erebidae. It is found on the Maluku Islands.
