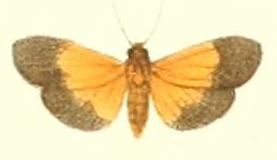

Scientific classification
- Domain: Eukaryota
- Kingdom: Animalia
- Phylum: Arthropoda
- Class: Insecta
- Order: Lepidoptera
- Superfamily: Noctuoidea
- Family: Erebidae
- Subfamily: Arctiinae
- Genus: Chiretolpis
- Species: C. bicolorata

Binomial name
- Chiretolpis bicolorata (Pagenstecher, 1900)

Synonyms
- Miltochrista bicolorata Pagenstecher, 1900; Chiretolpis bicolorata Draudt, 1914

= Chiretolpis bicolorata =

Species of moth

Chiretolpis bicolorata is a moth of the family Erebidae. It is found in Papua New Guinea.
