= Macroglossum alluaudi =

Scientific classification
- Kingdom: Animalia
- Phylum: Arthropoda
- Class: Insecta
- Order: Lepidoptera
- Family: Sphingidae
- Genus: Macroglossum
- Species: M. alluaudi

Binomial name
- Macroglossum alluaudi de Joannis, 1893

Species of moth

Seychelles hummingbird hawkmoth (Macroglossum alluaudi) is a moth of the family Sphingidae. It is known from the Seychelles.

There are three orange-yellow lateral spots on the abdomen. The forewing upperside is without a discal spot, but there are two heavy straight discal lines. The basal half of the forewing underside (apart from discal cell) is washed with pale chrome-yellow. The hindwing upperside is chrome-yellow, slightly shaded with orange distally. The fringe is brown, sometimes with a narrow brown marginal band. The hindwing underside is mostly washed with pale chrome-yellow.
