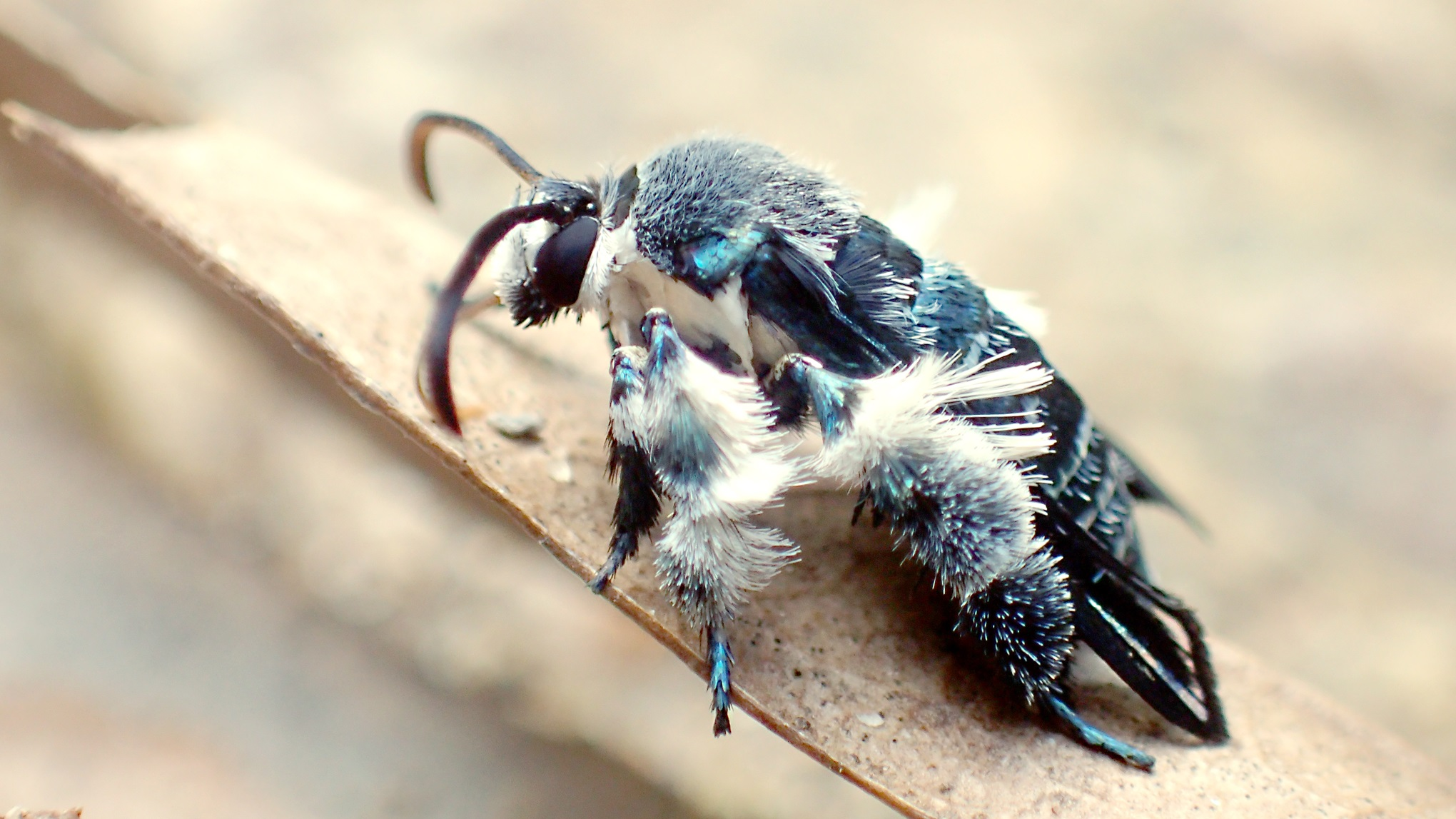
- Male

Scientific classification
- Domain: Eukaryota
- Kingdom: Animalia
- Phylum: Arthropoda
- Class: Insecta
- Order: Lepidoptera
- Family: Sesiidae
- Genus: Heterosphecia
- Species: H. tawonoides

Binomial name
- Heterosphecia tawonoides Kallies, 2003

= Heterosphecia tawonoides =

Species of moth

Heterosphecia tawonoides, the oriental blue clearwing, is a moth of the family Sesiidae, in the genus Heterosphecia. The sesiids are mimics, in general appearance similar to a bee or wasp. This species was described in 2003 by Axel Kallies, from a specimen collected in 1887.

== History ==
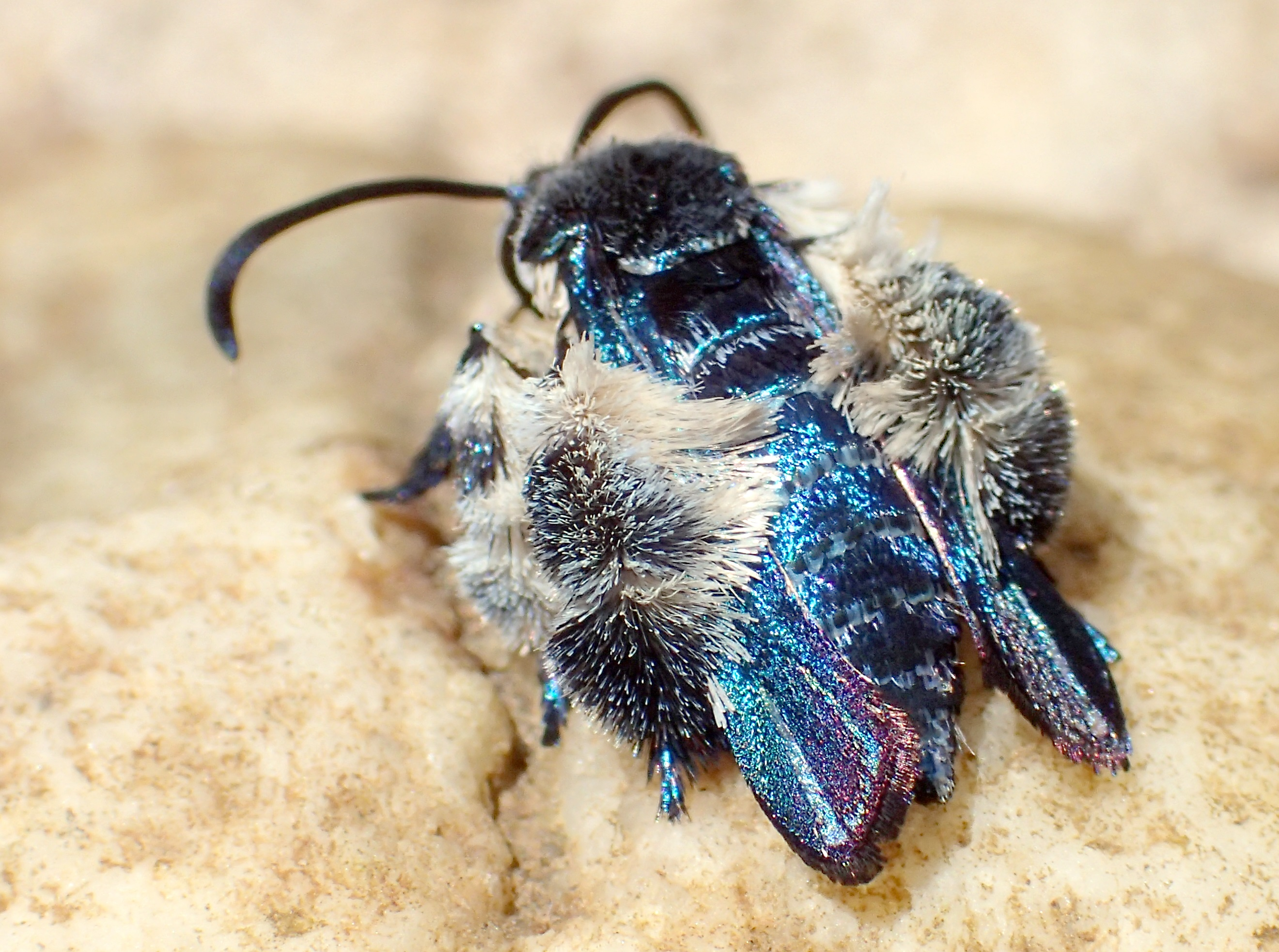
Heterosphecia tawonoides, male

Heterosphecia tawonoides was originally identified from a single damaged specimen collected from an unknown site in Sumatra in 1887. It was kept in the Natural History Museum, Vienna, and described by Axel Kallies in 2003.

In 2013, Marta Skowron Volponi of the University of Gdańsk refound the moth on a lowland dipterocarp forest river bank in Malaysia. It is likely that the moth gains some protection from predation by Batesian mimicry. The moth has been seen at Kuala Tahan and two other locations in Pahang, Malaysia.

== Distribution ==
It is known from Sumatra in Indonesia and Pahang in Malaysia.
