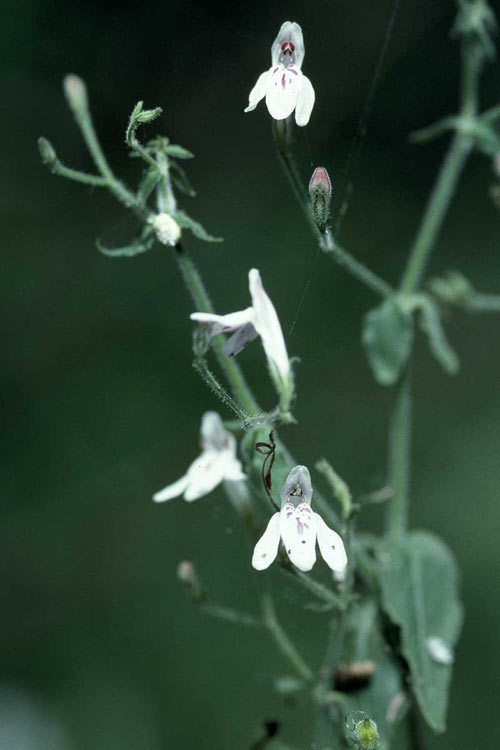

Conservation status
- Vulnerable (NCA)

Scientific classification
- Kingdom: Plantae
- Clade: Tracheophytes
- Clade: Angiosperms
- Clade: Eudicots
- Clade: Asterids
- Order: Lamiales
- Family: Acanthaceae
- Genus: Rhaphidospora
- Species: R. cavernarum

Binomial name
- Rhaphidospora cavernarum (F.Muell.) R.M.Barker

Synonyms
- Justicia cavernarum F.Muell.; Justicia platyphylla S.Moore; Rhaphidospora platyphylla (S.Moore) Bremek. nom. inval.

= Rhaphidospora cavernarum =

Species of plant

Rhaphidospora cavernarum is a plant species in the family Acanthaceae. The species was thought to be extinct in Queensland until rediscovered on Cape York, between Cooktown and the Lockhart River. Previous to this, the species had not been seen since 1873.

== Conservation status ==
This species is listed as "vulnerable" under the Queensland Nature Conservation Act 1992. It is not listed under the Australian Environment Protection and Biodiversity Conservation Act 1999.
