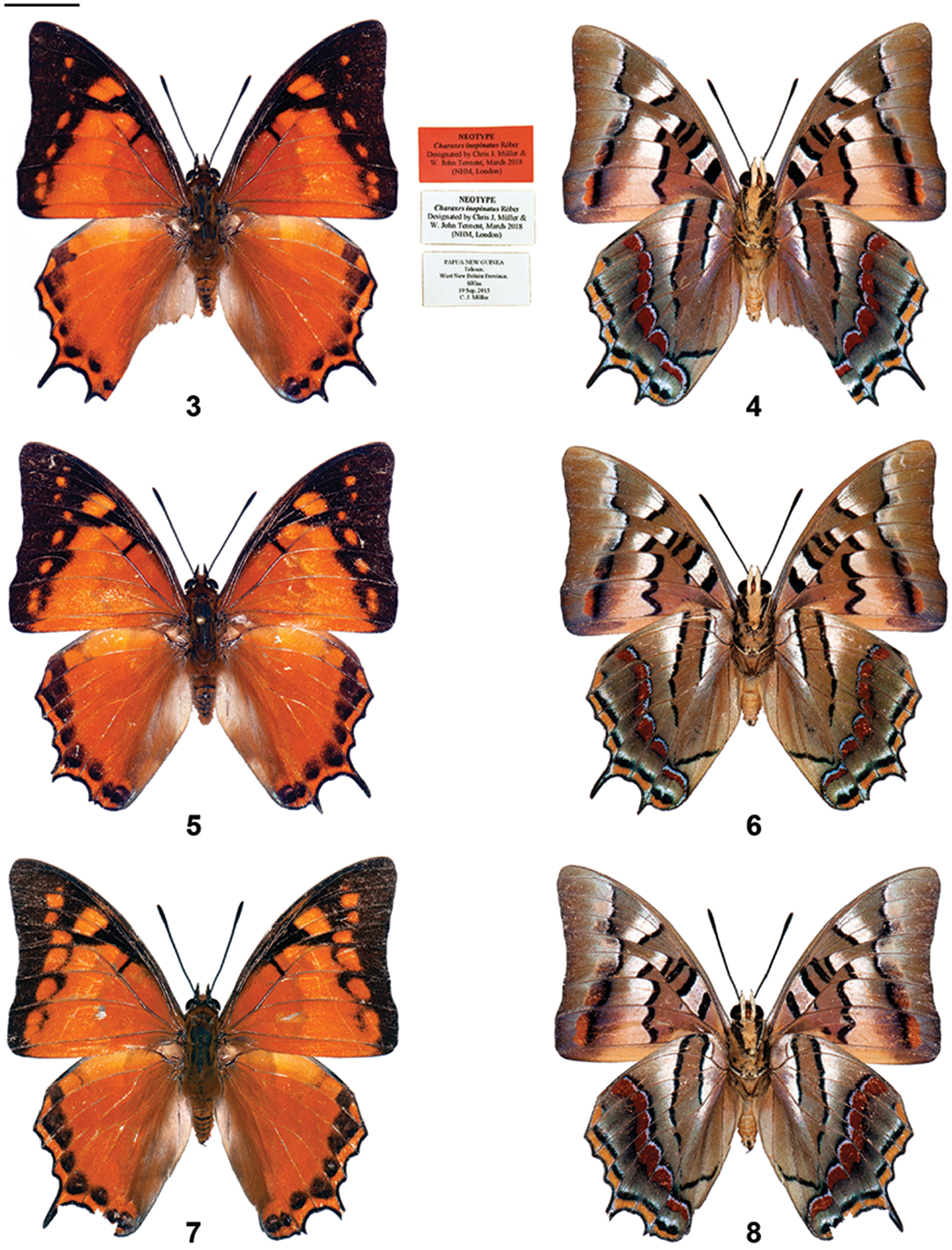

Scientific classification
- Kingdom: Animalia
- Phylum: Arthropoda
- Class: Insecta
- Order: Lepidoptera
- Family: Nymphalidae
- Genus: Charaxes
- Species: C. inopinatus

Binomial name
- Charaxes inopinatus (Röber, 1939)

Synonyms
- Polyura inopinatus

= Polyura inopinatus =

Species of butterfly

Charaxes (Polyura) inopinatus is a butterfly in the family Nymphalidae. It was described by Julius Röber in 1939. It was original described from Celebes, probably erroneously, but the original specimen was lost. In 2015 it was rediscovered in New Britain.
