= Atelopus ebenoides =

Conservation status
- Critically endangered, possibly extinct (IUCN 3.1)

Scientific classification
- Kingdom: Animalia
- Phylum: Chordata
- Class: Amphibia
- Order: Anura
- Family: Bufonidae
- Genus: Atelopus
- Species: A. ebenoides

Binomial name
- Atelopus ebenoides Rivero, 1963

Species of amphibian

Atelopus ebenoides, the Huila stubfoot toad, a species of true toad, lives only in Colombia. A southern population lives in the southern Colombian Andes in the Cauca and Huila Departments. The northern population (called A. e. marinkellei) may be a separate species and occurs only in the Boyacá Department, in the Cordillera Oriental.

The species' population has probably experienced a huge decline due to chytridiomycosis. The southern species has not been recorded since 1992, although no detailed searches have been attempted. The northern population was unrecorded from 1995, despite some searching, until it was spotted again in 2006.
