= Varanus douarrha =

Scientific classification
- Kingdom: Animalia
- Phylum: Chordata
- Class: Reptilia
- Order: Squamata
- Suborder: Anguimorpha
- Family: Varanidae
- Genus: Varanus
- Species: V. douarrha

Binomial name
- Varanus douarrha (Lesson, 1830)

Species of lizard

Varanus douarrha, the New Ireland monitor, is a species of lizard of the family Varanidae. It is found on New Ireland in Papua New Guinea.
