= Pristimantis ruidus =

Conservation status
- Critically Endangered (IUCN 3.1)The IUCN Red List of Threatened Species. Version 2026-1.

Scientific classification
- Kingdom: Animalia
- Phylum: Chordata
- Class: Amphibia
- Order: Anura
- Clade: Brachycephaloidea
- Family: Craugastoridae
- Genus: Pristimantis
- Species: P. ruidus

Binomial name
- Pristimantis ruidus (Lynch, 1979)

Synonyms
- Eleutherodactylus ruidus Lynch, 1979

Species of frog

Pristimantis ruidus is a species of frog in the family Strabomantidae. It is endemic to Ecuador. Its natural habitats are tropical moist montane forests, pastureland, and heavily degraded former forest.
