= Lyon's snake-eyed skink =

Conservation status
- Critically Endangered (IUCN 3.1)

Scientific classification
- Kingdom: Animalia
- Phylum: Chordata
- Class: Reptilia
- Order: Squamata
- Family: Scincidae
- Genus: Austroablepharus
- Species: A. barrylyoni

Binomial name
- Austroablepharus barrylyoni Couper, Limpus, McDonald & Amey, 2010

Synonyms
- Proablepharus barrylyoni Couper, Limpus, McDonald & Amey, 2010; Austroablepharis — Couper, Hoskin, Potter, Bragg & Moritz, 2018

Species of lizard

Lyon's snake-eyed skink (Austroablepharus barrylyoni) is a species of lizard in the family Scincidae. The species is endemic to Queensland in Australia.

== Etymology ==
The specific name, barrylyoni, is in honour of Australian wildlife conservationist Barry Lyon, who is the ranger in charge of the Steve Irwin Wildlife Reserve.

== Habitat ==
The preferred natural habitat of A. barrylyoni is grassland.

== Description ==
A. barrylyoni may attain a snout-to-vent length (SVL) of 5 cm (2.0 in). Its dorsal body pattern consists of alternating dark and light stripes. The tail is red/orange in adults.

== Reproduction ==
The mode of reproduction of A. barrylyoni is unknown.
