= Appalachia hebardi =

Scientific classification
- Kingdom: Animalia
- Phylum: Arthropoda
- Clade: Pancrustacea
- Class: Insecta
- Order: Orthoptera
- Suborder: Caelifera
- Family: Acrididae
- Tribe: Podismini
- Genus: Appalachia
- Species: A. hebardi

Binomial name
- Appalachia hebardi Rehn and Rehn, 1936

Endangered species of North American grasshopper

Appalachia hebardi, commonly known as the Appalachian grasshopper, is a species of non-flying grasshopper. First described in 1936, it was believed to have gone extinct in the 1940s until its rediscovery on the side of a road in Augusta County, Virginia, located in the Shenandoah Valley in 2024. The last sighting prior to 2024 was in 1946.

== Description ==
The Appalachian grasshopper is about an inch to an inch-and-a-half in length.

== Distribution ==
The species has been described in only three states: Pennsylvania, Virginia, and West Virginia.

== Conservation ==
Despite its rarity, the species has not been listed on any state or federal conservation guides.
