= Rhizopsammia wellingtoni =

Conservation status
- Critically endangered, possibly extinct (IUCN 3.1)

Scientific classification
- Kingdom: Animalia
- Phylum: Cnidaria
- Subphylum: Anthozoa
- Class: Hexacorallia
- Order: Scleractinia
- Family: Dendrophylliidae
- Genus: Rhizopsammia
- Species: R. wellingtoni

Binomial name
- Rhizopsammia wellingtoni Wells, 1982

Critically endangered species of Coral

Rhizopsammia wellingtoni, or Wellington's solitary coral, is an endemic species of coral from the Galápagos Islands in Ecuador, recorded between 2 and 43 metres (6.6 and 141.1 ft) underwater. Before 1982, this species was considered abundant at some sites, but the El Niño event of 1982 and 1983 destroyed most of its existing population. For more than two decades, the species evaded detection by researchers and was therefore presumed extinct. However, in January 2024, a joint expedition of researchers from the California Academy of Sciences, Galapagos National Park Directorate, and the Charles Darwin Foundation successfully identified the species at four locations off the coasts of Isabela and Fernandina, thus confirming its continued existence.

Due to the devastation wrought on its population by El Nino, this species is suspected to be exceptionally sensitive to changes in the temperature of water in which it occurs. Prior to its rediscovery, it was listed among the 25 "most wanted lost" species that are the focus of Re:wild's "Search for Lost Species" initiative.
