= Ansonia latidisca =

Conservation status
- Endangered (IUCN 3.1)

Scientific classification
- Kingdom: Animalia
- Phylum: Chordata
- Class: Amphibia
- Order: Anura
- Family: Bufonidae
- Genus: Ansonia
- Species: A. latidisca

Binomial name
- Ansonia latidisca Inger, 1966

Species of amphibian

Ansonia latidisca, commonly called the Sambas stream toad or Bornean rainbow toad, is a small true toad rediscovered in 2011 after being unseen since 1924. It is endemic to Borneo (Indonesia and Malaysia). Its natural habitats are tropical moist lowland forests and rivers. It is threatened by habitat loss.

== Description ==
The three specimens known as A. latidasca are small, ranging in size from 30 to 50 mm (1.2 to 2.0 in) in length. They are also nocturnal. They have long spindly limbs and variegated dorsal skin "splattered in bright green, purple, and red." The colorful spots on the dorsum are not flat but "pebbly" and have been compared to warts. Amphibian expert Robin Moore told National Geographic that such skin on a toad "usually indicates the presence of poison glands ... You probably don't want to put this in your mouth." Moore was the initiator of Conservation International's Search for Lost Frogs.

Herpetologist Indraneil Das, leader of the 2011 team that rediscovered the toad, called its coloration "mosslike" and noted that it may be an adaptation for camouflage on the mossy tree bark of its habitat.

== Conservation status and rediscovery ==
Ansonia latidisca was listed by Conservation International as one of the "world's top 10 most wanted frogs" in its Global Search for Lost Amphibians in 2010. It had not been seen since 1924. Until its recent rediscovery, the only depictions of the toad were drawings of specimens collected by explorers in the 1920s. The type specimen was collected by Johann Gottfried Hallier.

In July 2011, scientists from Universiti Malaysia Sarawak led by Dr. Indraneil Das found and photographed three specimens in the high branches of a tree after months of night expeditions in the Gunung Penrissen range of Western Sarawak. According to Moore, the team organized its search based on what was known of similar species, searching at night along streams for a toad they thought might be found climbing trees. Dr. Das said these were "standard search techniques appropriate for amphibians in rainforest habitats," adding that they entailed "dangers and annoyances" that included heavy rainfall, leeches, and poachers.

The scientists were concerned about giving public information about the toads' exact location, being worried about poachers and the international pet trade.
