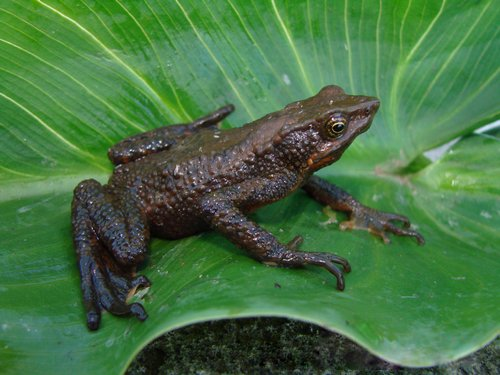

Conservation status
- Endangered (IUCN 3.1)

Scientific classification
- Kingdom: Animalia
- Phylum: Chordata
- Class: Amphibia
- Order: Anura
- Family: Bufonidae
- Genus: Atelopus
- Species: A. nahumae

Binomial name
- Atelopus nahumae Ruiz-Carranza, Ardila-Robayo, and Hernández-Camacho, 1994

= Atelopus nahumae =

Species of amphibian

Atelopus nahumae (San Lorenzo harlequin frog) is a species of toad in the family Bufonidae. It is endemic to Colombia and only known from humid montane forest of Sierra Nevada de Santa Marta in the Magdalena, La Guajira, and Cesar Departments.

== Description ==
Adult males measure 32 to 37 mm (1.3 to 1.5 in) and females 45–51 mm (1.8–2.0 in) in snout–vent length. The snout is acuminate or sub-acuminate. The tympanum is absent. The fingers have traces of basal webbing while the toes are fully (toes I to III) to partially webbed (toe IV). Skin is dorsally smooth but bears granules, small conical tubers, and small warts. Dorsal coloration is dark or light brown, with our without spots. There is a brown X-mark in the supra-scapular area. Some specimens have a dark-brown mid-dorsal line.

== Habitat and conservation ==
Atelopus nahumae inhabits sub-Andean forests at elevations of 1,900–2,800 m (6,200–9,200 ft) above sea level. It can also be found in closed-canopy secondary forests and riparian forests. Breeds takes place in streams.

This species is only known from four locations. Aggregations appear very localized, with nearby, suitable habitat uninhabited. It is potentially threatened by chytridiomycosis (although as of 2014, the disease has not been detected in Sierra Nevada de Santa Marta) and by habitat loss caused by agriculture and logging. The species occurs within the Parque Nacional Natural Sierra Nevada de Santa Marta as well as the adjacent El Dorado Nature Reserve.
