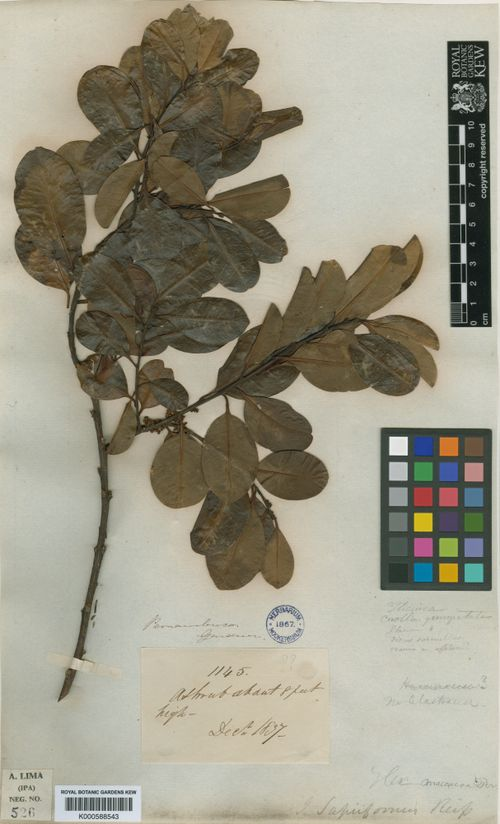
- dried specimen

Conservation status
- Critically endangered, possibly extinct (IUCN 3.1)

Scientific classification
- Kingdom: Plantae
- Clade: Embryophytes
- Clade: Tracheophytes
- Clade: Spermatophytes
- Clade: Angiosperms
- Clade: Eudicots
- Clade: Asterids
- Order: Aquifoliales
- Family: Aquifoliaceae
- Genus: Ilex
- Species: I. sapiiformis

Binomial name
- Ilex sapiiformis Reissek

= Ilex sapiiformis =

Species of plant

Ilex sapiiformis, also known as the Pernambuco holly, is a critically endangered tree in the family Aquifoliaceae endemic to the state of Pernambuco in Brazil.

== Description ==
The tree can grow up to 12 metres (39 ft) tall and is diecious. The flowers are small and white.

== Distribution and habitat ==
The species has been known only from a small patch of forest next to a sugarcane plantation in the Igarassu municipality of Pernambuco, close to the Greater Recife metropolitan area.

== Conservation ==
After the type specimen was described in 1836, no other individuals were found and the species was considered possibly extinct for nearly 200 years until 4 plants (2 males and 2 females) were found in March 2023. Since then, one of the trees has died, leaving only 3 known individuals, rendering the plant narrowly close to extinction unless captive propagation or habitat preservation is done.
