= Chiretolpis erubescens =

Scientific classification
- Kingdom: Animalia
- Phylum: Arthropoda
- Class: Insecta
- Order: Lepidoptera
- Superfamily: Noctuoidea
- Family: Erebidae
- Subfamily: Arctiinae
- Genus: Chiretolpis
- Species: C. erubescens

Binomial name
- Chiretolpis erubescens (Hampson, 1891)

Synonyms
- Tricholepis erubescens Hampson, 1891

Species of moth

Chiretolpis erubescens is a moth of the family Erebidae first described by George Hampson in 1891. It is found in India's Nilgiri Mountains.
