= Hiwegi Formation =

Geological formation in Kenya

- Stratigraphic range: Early Miocene; ~Burdigalian
- Type: Formation
- Unit of: Rusinga Group
- Sub-units: Kaswanga Point Member Grit Member Fossil Bed Member Kibanga Member
- Underlies: Kulu Formation
- Overlies: Rusinga Agglomerate
- Thickness: 57 m (Waregi Hills)

Lithology
- Primary: volcanic tuffs, clastic sediments

Location
- Region: Lake Victoria
- Country: Kenya

The Hiwegi Formation is a geological formation on Rusinga Island in Kenya preserving fossils dating to the Early Miocene period. The Hiwegi Formation is known for the well preserved plant fossils it preserves, which indicate a tropical forest environment that underwent wet and dry periods. The middle members of the formation in particular indicate a brief period in which conditions were notably dryer with a more open environment compared to older and younger units. Some of the formation's fauna, such as an early ancestor of the modern aye-aye and a chameleon of the genus Calumma, link Miocene East Africa to modern day Madagascar.

== History ==
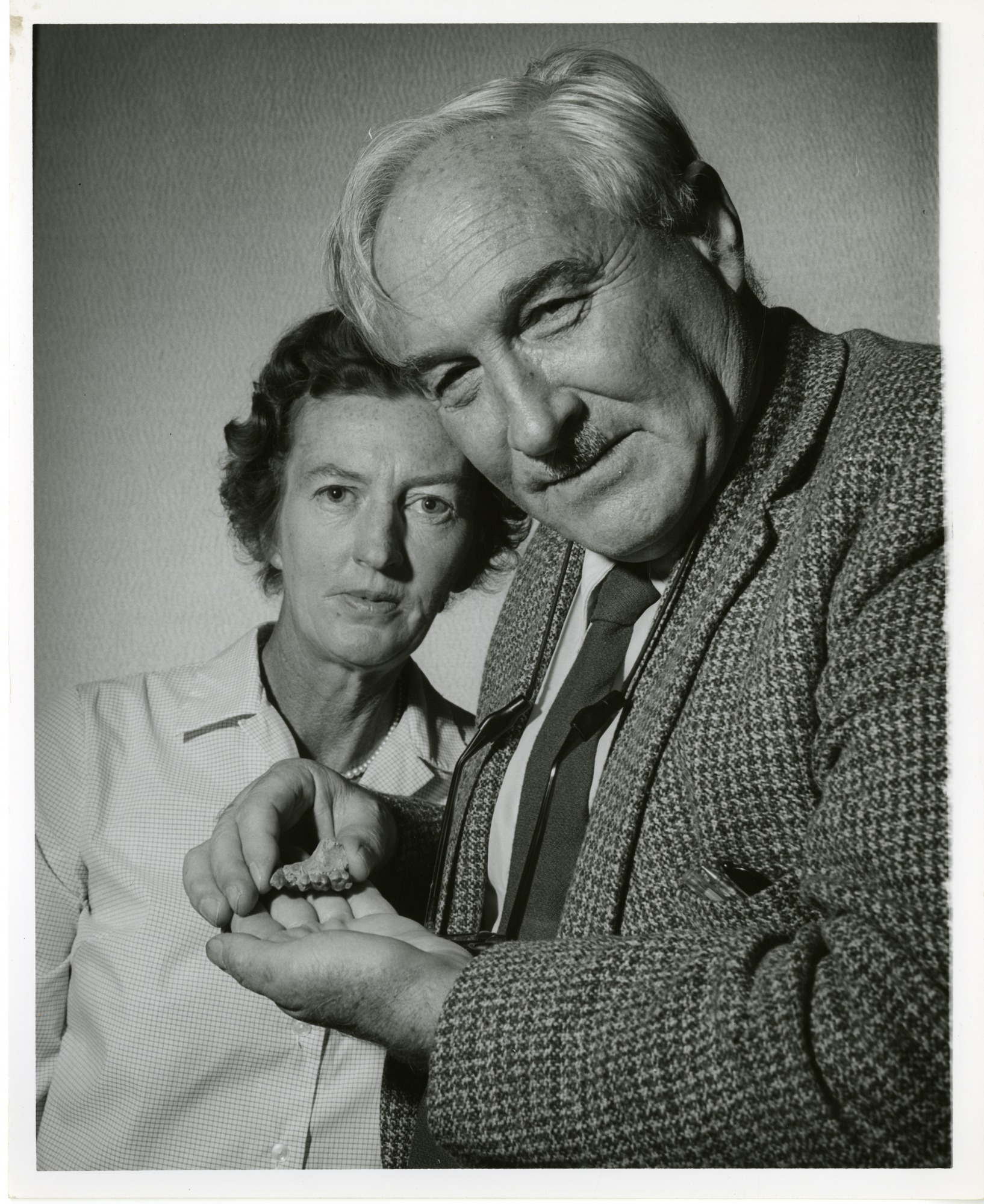
(right to left) Louis Seymour Bazett Leakey and Mary Douglas Nicol Leakey

The first discovery of fossil material by western researchers was documented in the early 20th century in the form of a British colonial report on the East Africa Protectorate. Excavations for fossils began in the 1930s with the work of Louis Leakey, followed by the British-Kenya Miocene Expedition. A major factor in the exploration of Rusinga Island was the discovery of several specimens originally assigned to the stem-hominoid Proconsul (now regarded as a distinct genus, Ekembo). Further interest for the formation was created due to the presence of ample non-primate fossil mammals, as well as a vast collection of fossil plants.

== Geography ==
Outcrops of the Hiwegi Formation are found across Rusinga Island, an island at the eastern end of Lake Victoria within Kenyan territory. The island itself is situated close to the mouth of the Winam Gulf. The Hiwegi Formation has outcrops across the islands, in particular in the area north-east of Mbita Point. Additional outcrops are found around the mountain Lugongo in the center of the island, Waregi Hills in the east as well as near Kiahera and Kaswanga on the islands north-western shore.

== Geology and Stratigraphy ==
The Hiwegi Formation is part of the larger Rusinga Group. During the Miocene the sediments now forming Rusinga Island were deposited on the flanks of the Kisingiri Volcano, which had formed in the early Miocene. Two hypotheses seek to explain the volcano's influence on the sediments. Drake et al. hypothesize that the Hiwegi Formation, alongside the Kiahera and Rusinga Agglomerate were deposited during early eruptions of the Kisingiri Volcano, prior to a period of silence during which the Kulu Formation was deposited and a second period of eruptions later. Bestland et al. (1995) meanwhile suggest that the Kisingiri Volcano experienced up to three periods of activity, with the strata of the Hiwegi Formation being deposited in the second and third period of volcanic activity. The formation generally underlies the younger Kulu Formation and overlies the Rusinga Agglomerate. However at Waregi Hills, in the east of the island, the formation overlies the Ombonya Beds which are found nowhere else on Rusinga. The sediments in this region are overlain by the Kiangata Agglomerate and the Lunene Lavas.

The formation is divided into four members.

- Kaswanga Point Member

The oldest member of the Hiwegi Formation, it consists primarily of air-filled tuffs and other units reworked from tuffaceous material. The fact that the member is composed of volcanic material indicates that the nearby Kisingiri Volcano was particularly active at the time the unit was deposited. Besides the tuffs this member also consists of fossil bearing mudstone which yielded fossil leaves in the Kiahera Hill fossil site, the sedimentology of which indicates deposition as part of a debris or mudflow following a volcanic eruption.

- Grit Member

The Grit Member is the second oldest member of the formation and underlies the Fossil Bed Member. It is primarily composed of tuffaceous sandstones and conglomerates consisting of pebbles in a sandy matrix. The layers of the Member indicate a fluvial or ponded mode of deposition which contrasts with the volcanic deposition of the Kibanga and Kaswanga Point Members. Palaeosols are found intercalated into these sediments. This member, as well as the overlying fossil bed member, were likely deposited in floodplain channels during flashfloods and mudflows. Additionally, they show signs of dryer conditions leading to salt hoppers and mud cracks.

- Fossil Bed Member

The Fossil Bed Member shows no differences in sedimentology compared to the Grit Member and was distinguished from the former on the basis of fossil material being absent in the older unit. Due to this lack of distinguishing features, the two groups are put together by Michel et al. (2020).

- Kibanga Member

Overall the Kibanga Member is dominated by airfilled tuffs much like the Kaswanga Point Member and is interbedded with sandstone, conglomerates and palaeosol. The fossil leaf bearing units of the Kibanga Member show a mix of interbedding layers of sandstone and mudstone. The mudstone was likely deposited during periodical wet seasons when ponds formed, followed by dry seasons creating desiccation cracks which are fond atop some of the mudstone layers.

K–Ar dating suggests a mean age of 17.8 million years for the formation. which correlates with the Burdigalian stage of the Miocene. In accordance with this method, the sediments of the Hiwegi Formation are thought to have been deposited over a short period of time, approximately 500.000 years. However dating of the formation has been met with difficulty due to the loss of certain minerals due to Diagenesis, the absence of other minerals important for dating and the effects of the Kisingiri volcano, which erupted through Precambrian sediments. Using Ar-Ar dating rather than K-Ar dating yields different results, still correlating to the Burdigalian but with a longer timespan dating from 20 to 17 million years ago.

== Paleoenvironment ==
Early studies on the paleoenvironment of the Hiwegi Formation resulted in a variety of contradicting hypothesis, suggesting environments ranging from tropical rainforest to semi-arid habitats. Later research consistently concluded that these mixed results were caused by imprecise sampling, using fossil material from different parts of Rusinga Island corresponding with different ages and treating them as being contemporary. Subsequently, scientists focused on much narrower regions, resulting in more consistent and precise results that showed a distinct change in environment between the different members of the formation. Among the most in depth works on the paleoenvironment was a publication by Baumgartner and Peppe from 2021. In this publication the authors analysed new material from the R3 (Kibanga Member) and Kiahera Hills localities (Kaswanga Point Member) while comparing the material to prior work and material from the R5 locality (Grit Member).

- Kaswanga Point Member

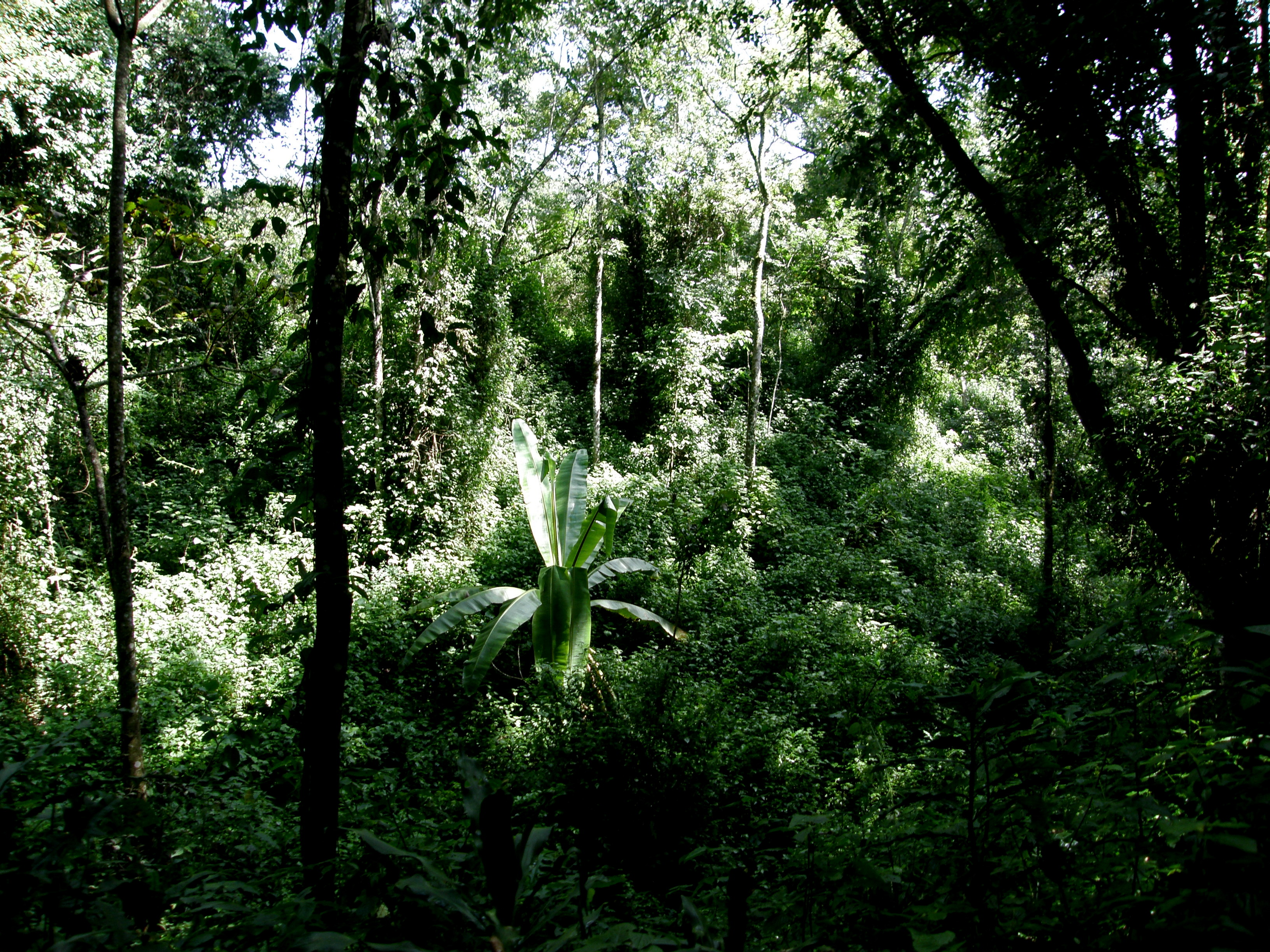
Kakamega Rainforest in Kenya

The fossils from the Kaswanga Point Member, specifically the Kiahera Hills, consisted mostly of the remains of woody plants with only a single monocot present and no herbaceous plants. This may however be tied to the way the plant material at Kiahera Hills was preserved, as the fossils are fragmentary and are thought to have been deposited following a short transportation related to a volcanic eruption. Thus, Baumgartner and Peppe suggest that herbaceous plants may not have been sturdy enough to withstand transportation. The great sample size nevertheless indicates that herbaceous plants would be uncommon, while gymnosperms and seed ferns may have been absent altogether. All recovered leaves were untoothed and on average mesophyll. Based on the characteristics of the leaves a mean annual temperature of 25 ± 4.9 °C (77.0 ± 8.8 °F) and a mean annual precipitation of 1,812–3,577 mm (71.3–140.8 in) per year were calculated. Analysis via Digital Leaf Physiognomy (DiLP) resulted in temperatures of 34.2 ± 4.0 °C (93.6 ± 7.2 °F) and precipitation of 1,198–3,978 mm (47.2–156.6 in) per year. Both results are indicative of wet and tropical seasonal forest or rainforest. Specific comparison is drawn to the rainforests near Monrovia (Liberia) and Kakamega (Kenya) as well as the seasonal forests found in Abidjan (Côte d'Ivoire).

- Grit Member

Research conducted by Collinson and colleagues in both 1985 and 2009 indicate a riverine woodland environment for the R117 locality within the Grit Member, basing their results on the fact that only 4.2% of the taxa analysed by them were definitive forest-dwellers. This interpretation is backed up by the presence of fossil seeds assigned to Cissus rusingensis, whose closest living relatives inhabit the same kind of environment suggested by Collinson.

A study from 2013 analysed fossil plant material collected at the R5 locality close to Kaswanga, north-west Rusinga Island, which was roughly contemporary to the locality studied by Collinson in 1985. Maxbauer and colleagues identify 5 stratigraphic layers within the Grit Member, which indicate the presence of moving water in some of them and signs of dryer conditions in others. The presence of grasses sharing affinities with Typha and Phragmites, known to inhabit wetland environments, as well as the fluvial sediments they were preserved in indicate a floodplain environment that was periodically flooded or at least submerged on occasion. High mean annual temperatures can be inferred from the leaf shapes (generally untoothed), however the authors refrain from calculating any precise temperatures given the limited sample size. The presence of salt hoppers furthermore indicates that the water at the locality at least sometimes evaporated, which in combination with the high temperatures may suggest seasons of low to no rainfall. The authors of the 2013 study do however note that there is no direct correlation between the studied area, which is part of the Grits Member, and the overlying Fossil Bed Member which yielded the majority of fossil vertebrate remains known from the formation. Overall Maxbauer and colleagues argue for a seasonal riparian environment covered in a patchwork of forests and woodlands.

The 2021 study found that the mean annual temperature was similar to that of the older Kaswanga Point Member, but with notably lower precipitation, 759–1,227 mm (29.9–48.3 in) per year, which makes the Grit Member the driest unit of the Hiwegi Formation. Although monocot diversity was low, Baumgartner and Peppe point out that they were among the most abundant morphotypes present. These results recovered by the 2021 study generally support Maxbauer's previous hypothesis of a riparian woodland environment with episodic dry periods followed by wet periods. This cycle would have created standing bodies of water which were inhabited hy crocodiles and hippos while rhino and primate fossils suggest the presence of both more open and closed environments within the unit.

- Kibanga Member

A study by Michael et al. analysed fossils from the R3 locality, which corresponds with the youngest member of the formation. Their research concluded that during that time the region was covered by dense, multistoried rainforests. Baumgartner and Peppe recognize that the vast majority of plant fossils were woody dicots of excellent preservation. Monocots and other herbaceous plants were however more prominent in this member than in older units, with varied flora occurring in patches. Some areas for instance were dominated by reeds or emergent aquatic plants (plants that root in the bodies of water but emerge above the surface). The distribution of woody plants and the patches of monocots is consistent with the tree stumps observed by Michael and colleagues, with areas poor in tree stumps being the same areas that yielded more remains of grasses. Most plant morphotypes from the R3 locality are untoothed and microphyll, resulting in an estimated mean annual temperature of 23.5 ± 4.9 °C (74.3 ± 8.8 °F) and mean annual precipitation of 1,210–2,389 mm (47.6–94.1 in) per year. Calculations using DiLP gave higher temperatures 29.1 ± 4.0 °C (84.4 ± 7.2 °F) and a mean annual precipitation of 1,092–3,627 mm (43.0–142.8 in) per year. These results are somewhat cooler and drier than the estimates for the Kaswanga Point Member and indicate tropical seasonal forests or woodlands to have been present during this stage of the Hiwegi Formation. The environment would have likely shown a patchwork of both densely wooded areas and more open areas containing periodic ponds and reeds. Analysis of the paleosol indicates the presence of distinct dry and wet seasons. Compared to the Kaswanga Point Member the Kibanga Member appears to have also been less diverse and is considered to be most similar to the environments today found in Abidjan (Côte d'Ivoire) and Kibwezi (Kenya).

== Paleofauna ==
The following fauna list is primarily based on the list published by Michel and colleagues in 2020, which incorporates prior work by Pickford (1986).

Color key: Taxon / Reclassified taxon / Taxon falsely reported as present / Dubious taxon or junior synonym / Ichnotaxon / Ootaxon / Morphotaxon	Notes; Uncertain or tentative taxa are in small text; ~~crossed out~~ taxa are discredited.

=== Reptiles ===
Name	Species	Member	Material	Notes	Image
Calumma	Calumma benovskyi		A complete skull.	A species of chameleon of the extant genus Calumna, all modern members of this genus are endemic to Madagascar.	Calumma benovskyi
Varanus	Varanus rusingensis	Grit Member	A partial skeleton	A molluscivorous species of monitor lizards reaching approximately one to two meters in length	
Euthecodon	Euthecodon sp.		A mandibular fragment	A long-snouted osteolaemine crocodile.	
Brochuchus	Brochuchus pigotti	Fossil Bed Member	Multiple specimens	A relatively small osteolaemine crocodile.	

=== Birds ===
Name	Species	Member	Material	Notes	Image
Leakeyornis	Leakeyornis aethiopicus		An incomplete upper and lower jaw and various limb bones.	A small-bodied genus of flamingo.	

=== Mammalia ===
==== Afrotheria ====
Name	Species	Member	Material	Notes	Image
Afrohyrax	Afrohyrax championi	Grit/Fossil Bed Member Kibanga Member	Several fossils including three skulls.	A medium-sized titanohyracid hyrax.	Afrohyrax championi skull
Gomphotheriidae		Grit/Fossil Hill Member Kibanga Member		Identified as Gomphotherium by Williamson & Ashley (1982) and as cf. Archaeobelodon by Tassy (1994).	
Hiwegicyon	Hiwegicyon juvenalis		The milk teeth of a juvenile specimen.	A species of elephant shrew with unknown affinities.	
Kelba	Kelba quadeemae	Grit/Fossil Bed Member?	The first or second molar	A genus of ptolemaiid mammal, its exact relationship is unknown but recent analysis have placed the group in Afrotheria.	
Meroehyrax	Meroehyrax bateae	Grit/Fossil Hill Member		A pliohyracid hyrax.	
Miorhynchocyon	Miorhynchocyon clarki	Grit/Fossil Hill Member		A species of rhynchocyonine elephant shrew.	
Myohyrax	Myohyrax oswaldi	Grit/Fossil Hill Member Kibanga Member	A crushed skull.	A type of elephant-shrew originally thought to be a dwarf hyrax. It reached a total length of 200 mm (7.9 in).	Holotype of Myohyrax
Myorycteropus	Myorycteropus africanus	Grit/Fossil Hill Member Kibanga Member		A small species of aardvark approximately half the size of the extant aardvark.	Myorycteropus africanus
Parageogale	Parageogale aletris	Kibanga Member		A genus of tenrec of the Geogalinae.	
Prodeinotherium	Prodeinotherium hobleyi	Grit/Fossil Hill Member Kibanga Member		A deinotheriine proboscidean.	
Protenrec	Protenrec tricuspis	Grit/Fossil Hill Member		A genus of tenrec of the Protenrecinae.	

==== Artiodactyla ====
Name	Species	Member	Material	Notes	Image
Canthumeryx	Canthumeryx sirtensis	Grit/Fossil Hill Member Kibanga Member		An early type of giraffe of the subfamily Canthumerycinae.	
Diamantohyus	Diamantohyus africanus	Grit/Fossil Bed Member Kibanga Member		A suiform belonging to the family Sanitheriidae.	
Dorcatherium	Dorcatherium chappuisi Dorcatherium moruorotensis Dorcatherium parvum Dorcatherium pigotti Dorcatherium songhorensis	Grit/Fossil Bed Member Kibanga Member		Several species of chevrotain.	
Libycochoerus	Libycochoerus anchidens	Grit/Fossil Hill Member Kibanga Member		A listriodontine pig closely related to Kubanochoerus. It was previously regarded to be a species of Kubanochoerus.	
Kenyasus	Kenyasus rusingensis	Grit/Fossil Bed Member Kibanga Member		A species of pig.	
Nguruwe	Nguruwe kijivium	Grit/Fossil Hill Member Kibanga Member		A hyotheriine pig.	
Propalaeoryx	Propalaeoryx nyanzae	Grit/Fossil Hill Member Kibanga Member		A stem-giraffe.	
Rusingameryx	Rusingameryx aequatorialis	Grit/Fossil Bed Member Kibanga Member?		An anthracothere.	
Sivameryx	Sivameryx africanus	Grit/Fossil Hill Member Kibanga Member		A species of anthracothere.	
Walangania	Walangania africanus	Grit/Fossil Hill Member Kibanga Member		A pecoran artiodactyl.	

==== Carnivora ====
Name	Species	Member	Material	Notes	Image
Asilifelis	Asilifelis coteae	Fossil Bed Member	The fragment of a mandibular ramus.	A small-bodied felid, approximately the size of the smallest living cats.	
Afrosmilus	Afrosmilus africanus Afrosmilus turkanae	Grit/Fossil Bed Member Kibanga Member		A genus of barbourofelid.	
Cynelos	Cynelos macrodon	Grit/Fossil Hill Member Kibanga Member	Molars	A large amphicyonid originally described as Hecubides. Subsequent research has generally placed the species in Cynelos however.	
Hemicyon	Hemicyon sp.			A basal genus of ursid.	
Herpestides	Herpestides aequatorialis	Grit/Fossil Bed Member		A genus of viverrid.	
Kichechia	Kichcechia zamanae	Grit/Fossil Hill Member Kibanga Member	Multiple specimens.	A common species of viverrid of the subfamily Paradoxurinae.	
Luogale	Luogale rusingensis	Grit/Fossil Bed Member	A molar and a premolar.		

==== Eulipotyphla ====
Name	Species	Member	Material	Notes	Image
Amphechinus	Amphechinus rusingensis	Grit/Fossil Bed Member Kibanga Member		A widespread generalist species of hedgehog.	
Galerix	Galerix africanus	Grit/Fossil Bed Member		A species of gymnure.	
Gymnurechinus	Gymnurechinus leakeyi	Grit/Fossil Hill Member Kibanga Member		A species of hedgehog.	

==== Glires ====
Name	Species	Member	Material	Notes	Image
Diamantomys	Diamantomys luederitzi	Grit/Fossil Bed Member Kibanga Member		A phiomorph rodent.	
Epiphiomys	Epiphiomys coryndoni	Grit/Fossil Bed Member		A thryonomyid rodent, it may be closely related to Lavocatomys.	
Kenyalagomys	Kenyalagomys rusingae Kenyalagomys minor	Grit/Fossil Bed Member Kibanga Member		A species of Pika, it is considered synonymous with Austrolagomys by Mein and Pickford.	
Kenyamys	Kenyamys mariae	Grit/Fossil Bed Member Kibanga Member		A phiomorph rodent.	
Lavocatomys	Lavocatomys aequatorialis	Grit/Fossil Bed Member Kibanga Member		A thryonomyoid rodent possibly related to Epiphiomys. It was previously regarded to be a species of Phiomys andrewsi.	
Megapedetes	Megapedetes pentadactylus	Grit/Fossil Bed Member Kibanga Member		An extinct relative of modern springhares.	
Nonanomalurus	Nonanomalurus soniae	Kibanga Member		An arboreal rodent of the Anomaluroidea, it was originally a species of Paranomalurus.	
Notocricetodon		Grit/Fossil Bed Member		A cricetodontid rodent.	
Paranomalurus		Grit/Fossil Bed Member Kibanga Member		A gliding "squirrel" of the family Anomaluridae.	
Paraphiomys	Paraphiomys pigotti Paraphiomys renelavocati	Grit/Fossil Bed Member Kibanga Member		A thryonomyid rodent. P. revenlavocati was previously known as Apodecter stromeri.	
Proheliophobius	Proheliophobius leakeyi	Grit/Fossil Bed Member?		A possible relative of modern blesmols, named for its similarity to the extant Silvery mole-rat.	
Protarsomys	Protarsomys macinnesi	Grit/Fossil Bed Member		A genus of rodent.	
Rusingapedetes	Rusingapedetes tsujikawai	Grit/Fossil Bed Member	A complete skull and multiple teeth.	A genus of springhare.	
Simonimys	Simonimys genovefae	Grit/Fossil Bed Member Kibanga Member		A kenyamyid rodent.	
Vulcanisciurus	Vulcanisciurus africanus	Grit/Fossil Bed Member Kibanga Member		A genus of squirrel.	

==== Hyaenodonta ====
Name	Species	Member	Material	Notes	Image
Anasinopa	Anasinopa leakeyi	Grit/Fossil Hill Member Kibanga Member	One individual and several isolated teeth.	The second largest hyainailourid found on Rusinga Island.	
Dissopsalis	Dissopsalis pyroclasticus		A mandible containing the teeth from the fourth premolar to the third molar.	A teratodontine hyaenodont.	
Exiguodon	Exiguodon pilgrimi		A mandible containing both rami as well as the neurocranium and the seventh cervical vertebra.	A diminutive hyainailourid originally described as a species of Isohyaenodon. It was recovered from site R 114.	
Hyainailouros	Hyainailouros napakensis	Kibanga Member		The largest hyainailourid of Rusinga Island.	
Isohyaenodon	Isohyaenodon zadoki	Grit/Fossil Hill Member Kibanga Member	Maxilla containing two molars.	Formerly classified under the genus Metapterodon.	
Leakitherium	Leakitherium hiwegi	Kibanga Member	A fragment of the left maxilla with the first and second molar as well as unpublished dentition.	A hyaenodont related to Dissopsalis.	Leakitherium hiwegi

==== Perissodactyla ====
Name	Species	Member	Material	Notes	Image
Brachypotherium	Brachypotherium minor	Grit/Fossil Hill Member	Teeth and an astragalus.	An indetermined species of brachypothere rhinoceros.	
Rusingaceros	Rusingaceros leakeyi	Grit/Fossil Hill Member		A genus of rhinoceros originally described as a species of Dicerorhinus.	
Turkanatherium	Turkanatherium acutirostratum	Grit/Fossil Hill Member Kibanga Member		A type of rhinoceros.	
Winamia	Winamia rusingensis	Grit/Fossil Bed Member Kibanga Member	Multiple specimens including the holotype maxilla.	A small, long-faced species of chalicothere.	

==== Primates ====
Name	Species	Member	Material	Notes	Image
Dendropithecus	Dendropithecus macinnesi	Grit/Fossil Hill Member Kibanga Member	Multiple specimens	A species of stem-catarrhine of the family Dendropithecidae. It was previously thought to have been a species of Limnopithecus.	Dendropithecus macinnesi
Ekembo	Ekembo heseloni Ekembo helsoni	Grit/Fossil Bed Member Kibanga Member	Multiple well preserved specimens.	Two species of hominoid primates previously assigned to the genus Proconsul. The two species differ in size, with Ekembo helsoni being the smaller of the two.	Ekembo nyanzae
Komba	Komba minor Komba walkeri	Grit/Fossil Hill Member Kibanga Member	Cranial and postcranial remains.	Species of galagos previously referred to Progalagos.	
Limnopithecus	Limnopithecus legetet	Grit/Fossil Bed Member Kibanga Member		A widespread species of catarrhine monkey.	
Mioeuoticus	Mioeuoticus shipmani Mioeuoticus bishopi?	Grit/Fossil Hill Member Kibanga Member	A partial cranium	A species of Loris, its skull had previously been assigned to Progalago. It has been suggested that material of Progalago from Rusinga instead belongs to Mioeuoticus bishopi.	
Nyanzapithecus	Nyanzapithecus vancouveringi	Grit/Fossil Hill Member Kibanga Member	Fragmentary remains including maxillae, mandibles and isolated teeth.	A dendropithecid primate.	
Progalago	Progalago songhorensis			A species of galago, it has been suggested that the material from Rusinga should instead be transferred into the loris Mioeuoticus bishopi.	
Propotto	Propotto leakeyi	Kibanga Member	Several partial mandibles.	An early member of Chiromyiformes and relative of the modern Aye-aye.	
