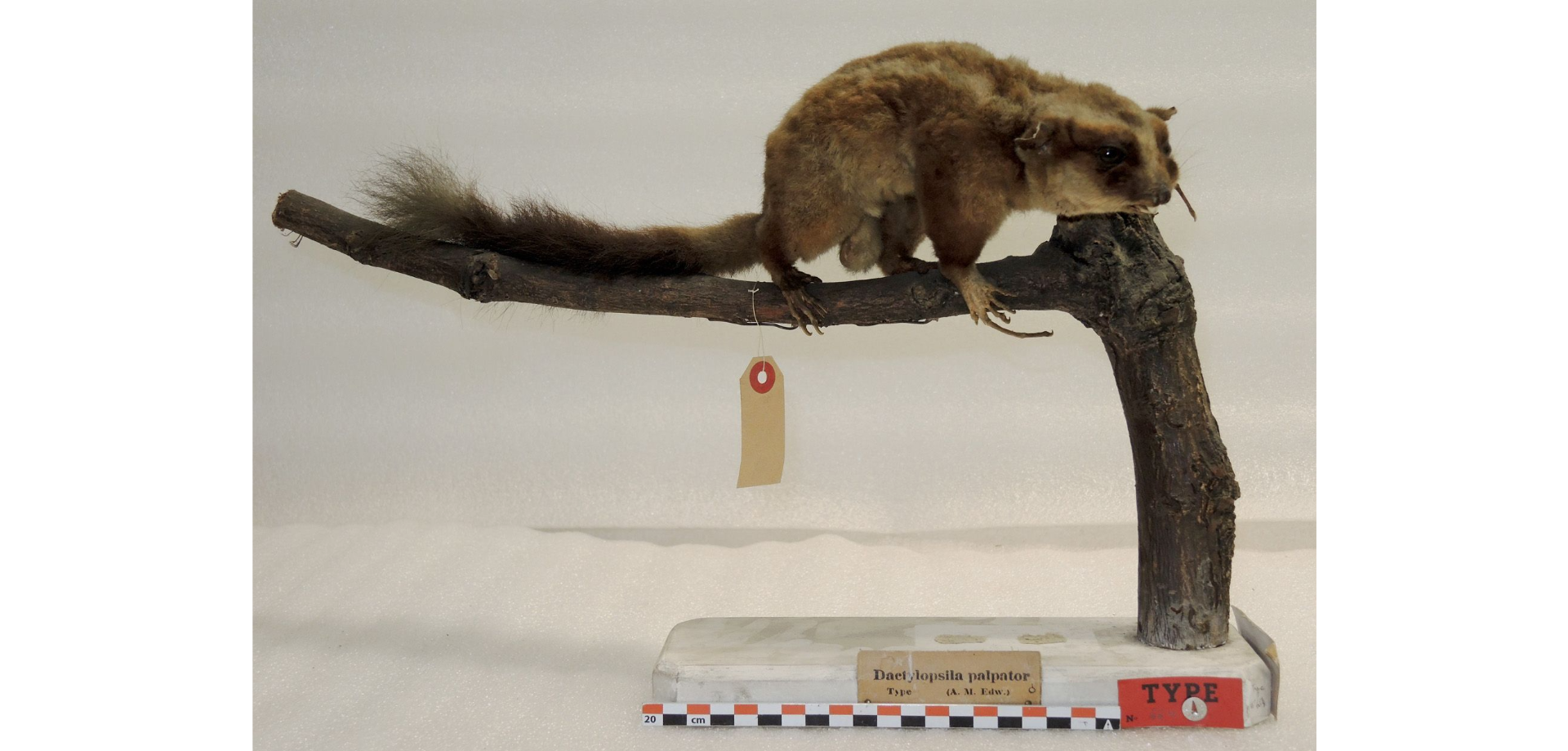

Conservation status
- Least Concern (IUCN 3.1)

Scientific classification
- Kingdom: Animalia
- Phylum: Chordata
- Class: Mammalia
- Infraclass: Marsupialia
- Order: Diprotodontia
- Family: Petauridae
- Genus: Dactylopsila
- Species: D. palpator

Binomial name
- Dactylopsila palpator A. Milne-Edwards, 1888
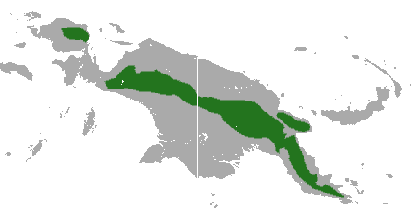
- Long-fingered triok range

= Long-fingered triok =

Species of marsupial

The long-fingered triok (Dactylopsila palpator) is a species of marsupial in the family Petauridae. It is found in West Papua, Indonesia and Papua New Guinea.

It is known as blc in the Kalam language of Papua New Guinea.

In 2026, a species that was thought to be extinct for 6000 years was discovered in New Guinea. Research on this discovery, along with comparisons with other members of the genus Dactylopsila, led to a proposal to split the genus into two genera as follows: Dactylopsila would retain D. megalura, D. tatei, and D. trivirgata. Genus Dactylonax would be resurrected with D. palpator as its type, but sensu stricto. Dactylonax ernstmayri, formerly a subspecies of D. palpator, would be elevated to species level, and the rediscovered Dactylonax kambuayai placed in the resurrected genus. In addition, these two genera are combined in subfamily Dactylopsilinae.
