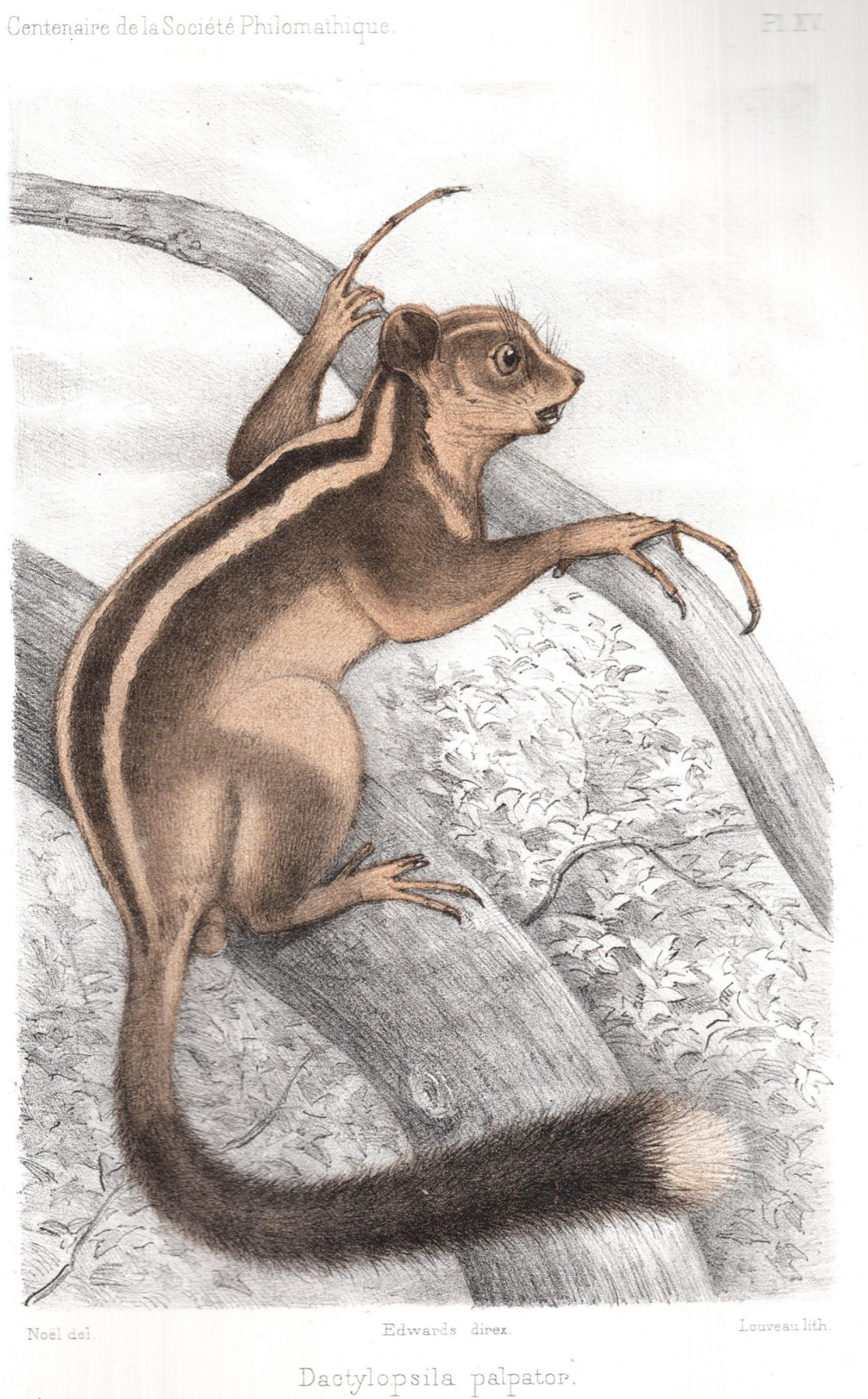
- The type species Dactylonax palpator

Scientific classification
- Kingdom: Animalia
- Phylum: Chordata
- Class: Mammalia
- Infraclass: Marsupialia
- Order: Diprotodontia
- Family: Petauridae
- Subfamily: Dactylopsilinae
- Genus: Dactylonax; Thomas, 1910

Type species
- Dactylopsila palpator Milne-Edwards, 1888

= Dactylonax =

Genus of mammals

Dactylonax is a genus of petaurid marsupials, with an elongated fourth finger and highly specialized incisor teeth; being comparable to the aye-aye of Madagascar, these adaptations are the product of convergent evolution.

In 2026, a species that was thought to be extinct for 6000 years was discovered in New Guinea. Research on this discovery, along with comparisons with other members of genus Dactylopsila, led to a proposal to split Dactylopsila into two genera as follows: Dactylopsila would retain D. megalura, D. tatei, and D. trivirgata. Genus Dactylonax would be resurrected with D. palpator as its type, but sensu stricto. Dactylonax ernstmayri, formerly a subspecies of D. palpator, would be elevated to species level, and the rediscovered Dactylonax kambuayai placed in the resurrected genus. In addition, these two genera are combined in subfamily Dactylopsilinae.
