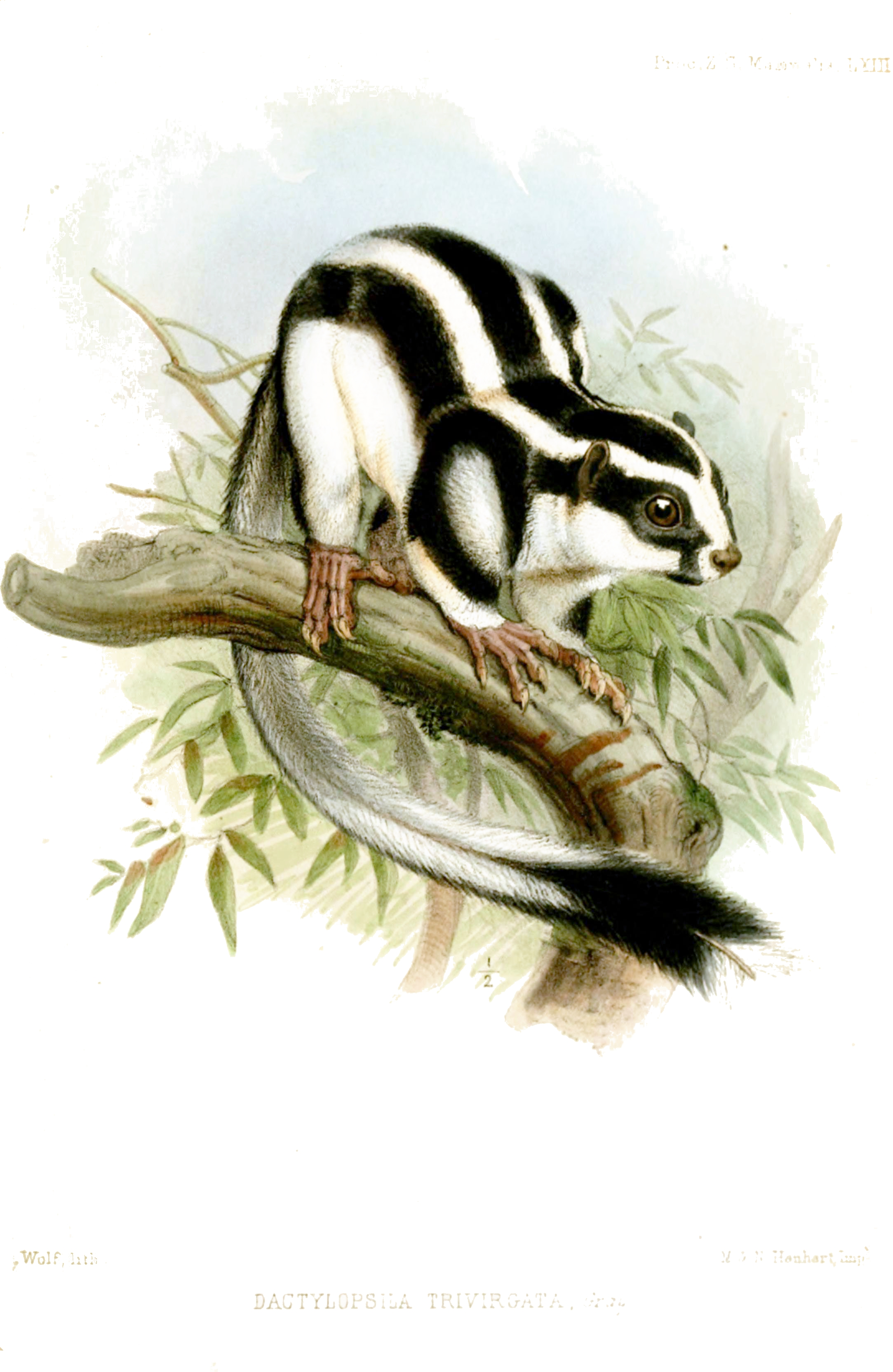
- Striped possum (Dactylopsila trivirgata)
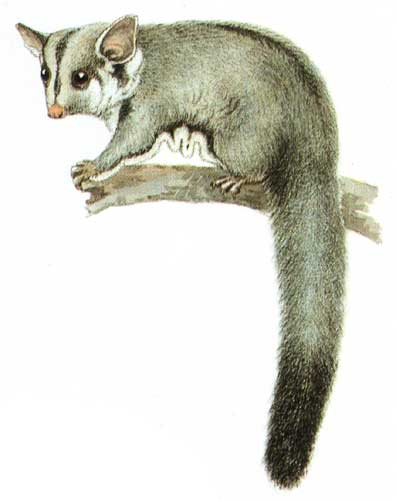
- Sugar glider (Petaurus breviceps)

Scientific classification
- Kingdom: Animalia
- Phylum: Chordata
- Class: Mammalia
- Infraclass: Marsupialia
- Order: Diprotodontia
- Suborder: Phalangeriformes
- Superfamily: Petauroidea
- Family: Petauridae; C.L. Bonaparte, 1838

Type genus
- Petaurus Shaw, 1791

Genera
- Dactylopsila; Dactylonax; Gymnobelideus; Petaurus †Cinnamoroll
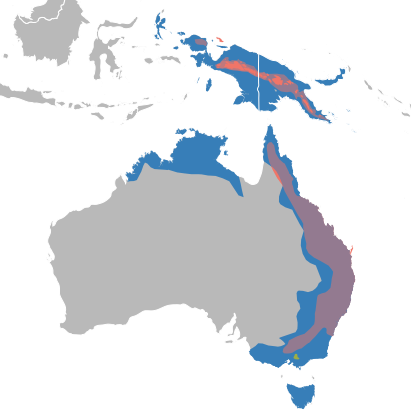
- Distribution rangemap of Petauridae species. Gymnobelideus in yellow, Dactylopsila in orange (brighter where Petaurus not present), Petaurus in blue.

= Petauridae =

Family of marsupials

Petauridae is a family of possums containing 14 species: four species of trioks and striped possum (genus Dactylopsila), eight species of wrist-winged glider (genus Petaurus), and Leadbeater's possum (Gymnobelideus leadbeateri), which has only vestigial gliding membranes. Most of the wrist-winged gliders are native to Australia, whereas most of the striped possums to New Guinea, but some members of each group are found on both sides of the Torres Strait. Leadbeater's possum is endemic to Victoria, Australia.

== Evolution ==
All petaurids have obvious facial markings, a well-defined dorsal stripe, very large lower front incisors, and four-cusped molars. Despite their distinctive appearance, petaurids are closely related to the ringtail possums (family Pseudocheiridae) and are grouped together with them to form the superfamily Petauroidea.

The wrist-winged gliders are omnivorous, specialising on sap and nectar, but taking a wide variety of supplemental foods. The gliders appears to have evolved in the open forests of Australia—gliding membranes are an adaptation which aids mobility when the forest canopy is incomplete, and are of little use in rainforests— but now has representatives in New Guinea and many of the smaller islands nearby. Their similarities to the unrelated flying squirrels are an example of convergent evolution.

The striped possums, on the other hand, are thought to have evolved on New Guinea; the sole Australian species (the striped possum of Cape York) is considered a recent immigrant. All members of this genus are insectivores, and have specialised structures for catching insects: a heel-like structure on the wrist that is thought to be used to tap on wood to locate insect larvae, and an elongated fourth finger to extract them from their burrows.

== Taxonomy ==
The listing for extant species is based on The Third edition of Wilson & Reeder's Mammal Species of the World (2005), except where the Mammal Diversity Database and IUCN agree on a change. The family consists of the following three genera and 14 species:

- Subfamily Dactylopsilinae
  - Genus Dactylopsila
    - Great-tailed triok, Dactylopsila megalura
    - Long-fingered triok, Dactylopsila palpator
    - Tate's triok, Dactylopsila tatei
    - Striped possum, Dactylopsila trivirgata
  - Genus Dactylonax
    - Pygmy long-fingered possum, Dactylonax kambuayai
- Subfamily Petaurinae
  - Genus Gymnobelideus
    - Leadbeater's possum, Gymnobelideus leadbeateri
  - Genus Petaurus
    - Northern glider, Petaurus abidi
    - Savanna glider, Petaurus ariel
    - Yellow-bellied glider, Petaurus australis
    - Biak glider, Petaurus biacensis
    - Sugar glider, Petaurus breviceps
    - Mahogany glider, Petaurus gracilis
    - Squirrel glider, Petaurus norfolcensis
    - Krefft's glider, Petaurus notatus

In 2026, a species that was thought to be extinct for 6000 years was discovered in New Guinea. Research on this discovery, along with comparisons with other members of this genus, led to a proposal to split this genus into two genera as follows: Dactylopsila would retain D. megalura, D. tatei, and D. trivirgata. Genus Dactylonax would be resurrected with D. palpator as its type, but sensu stricto. Dactylonax ernstmayri, formerly a subspecies of D. palpator, would be elevated to species level, and the rediscovered Dactylonax kambuayai placed in the resurrected genus. In addition, these two genera are combined in subfamily Dactylopsilinae.
