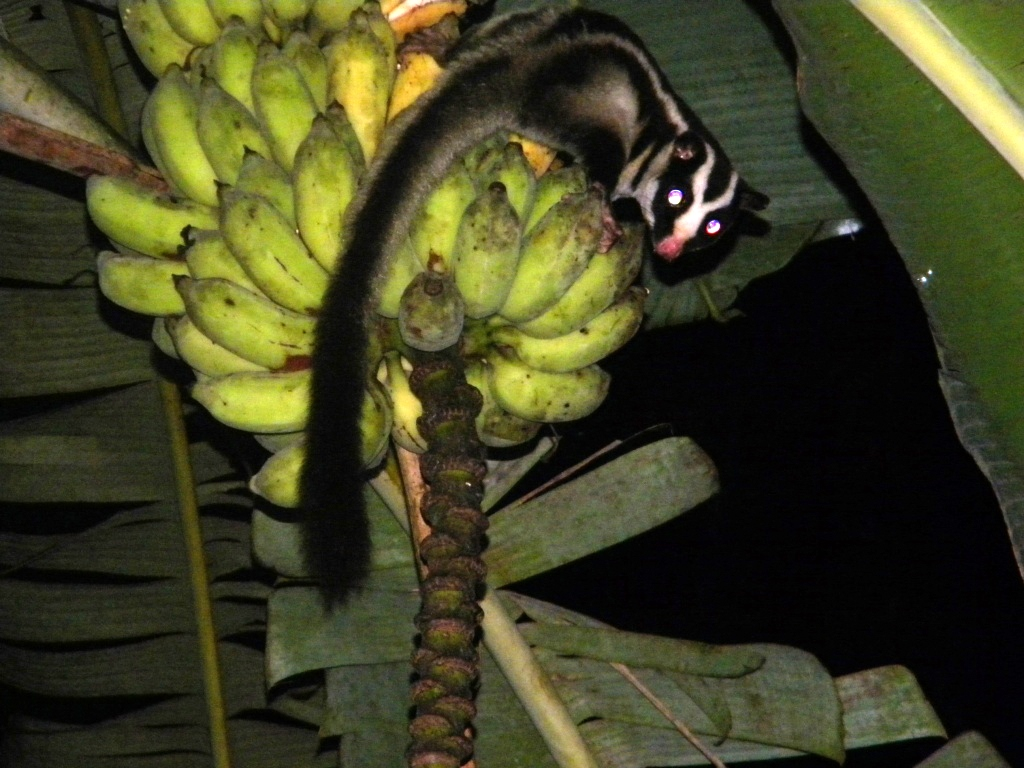
- At Cooktown, Queensland

Conservation status
- Least Concern (IUCN 3.1)

Scientific classification
- Kingdom: Animalia
- Phylum: Chordata
- Class: Mammalia
- Infraclass: Marsupialia
- Order: Diprotodontia
- Family: Petauridae
- Genus: Dactylopsila
- Species: D. trivirgata

Binomial name
- Dactylopsila trivirgata J. E. Gray, 1858
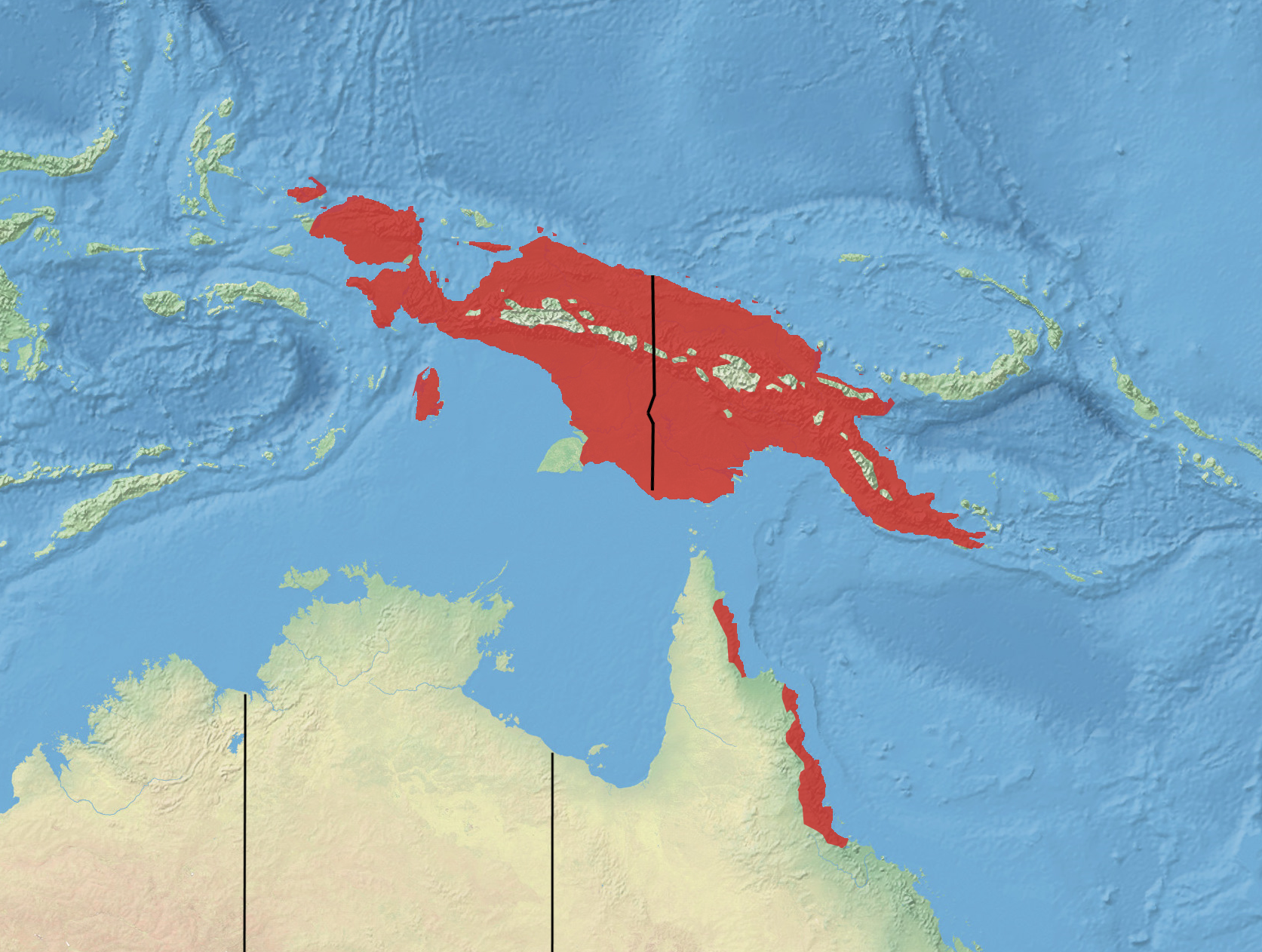
- Distribution of the striped possum

= Striped possum =

Species of marsupial

The striped possum or common striped possum (Dactylopsila trivirgata) is a member of the marsupial family Petauridae. It is found mainly in New Guinea. The species is black with three white stripes running head to tail, and its head has white stripes that form a 'Y' shape. It is closely related to the sugar glider, and is similar in appearance.

== Taxonomy ==
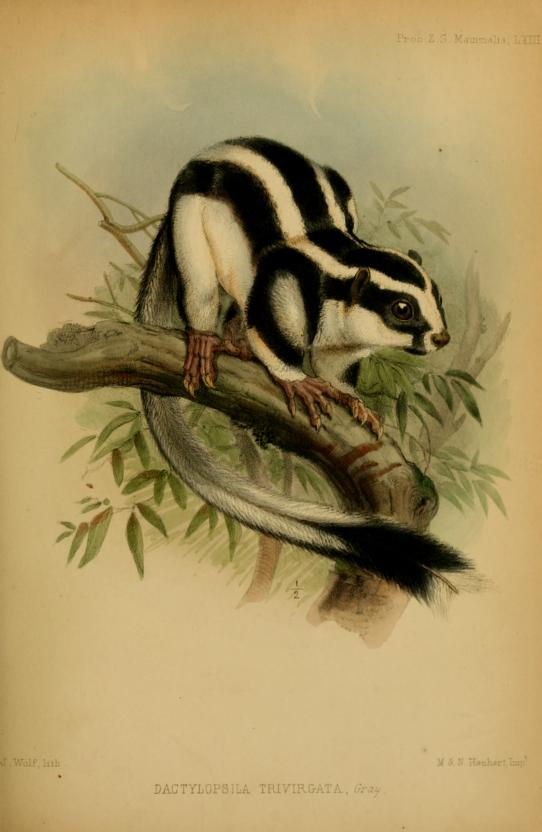
1858 illustration by Joseph Wolf, Proceedings of the Zoological Society of London.

The striped possum was first described by John Edward Gray in 1858 from a specimen sent from the Aru Islands (in Indonesia) to the British Museum by Alfred Russel Wallace. Gray gave the species the name Dactylopsila trivirgata in 1858, the name the species retains today. The illustration that appeared alongside the first description was produced by Joseph Wolf.

== Range ==
The striped possum is most commonly found in New Guinea as well as several other small islands in the area (including the Solomon Islands). It also lives in Queensland, Australia, in rainforests and eucalypt woodland along the east coast of Cape York Peninsula and as far south as Townsville, but is rarely seen and uncommon in Australia.

== Description ==
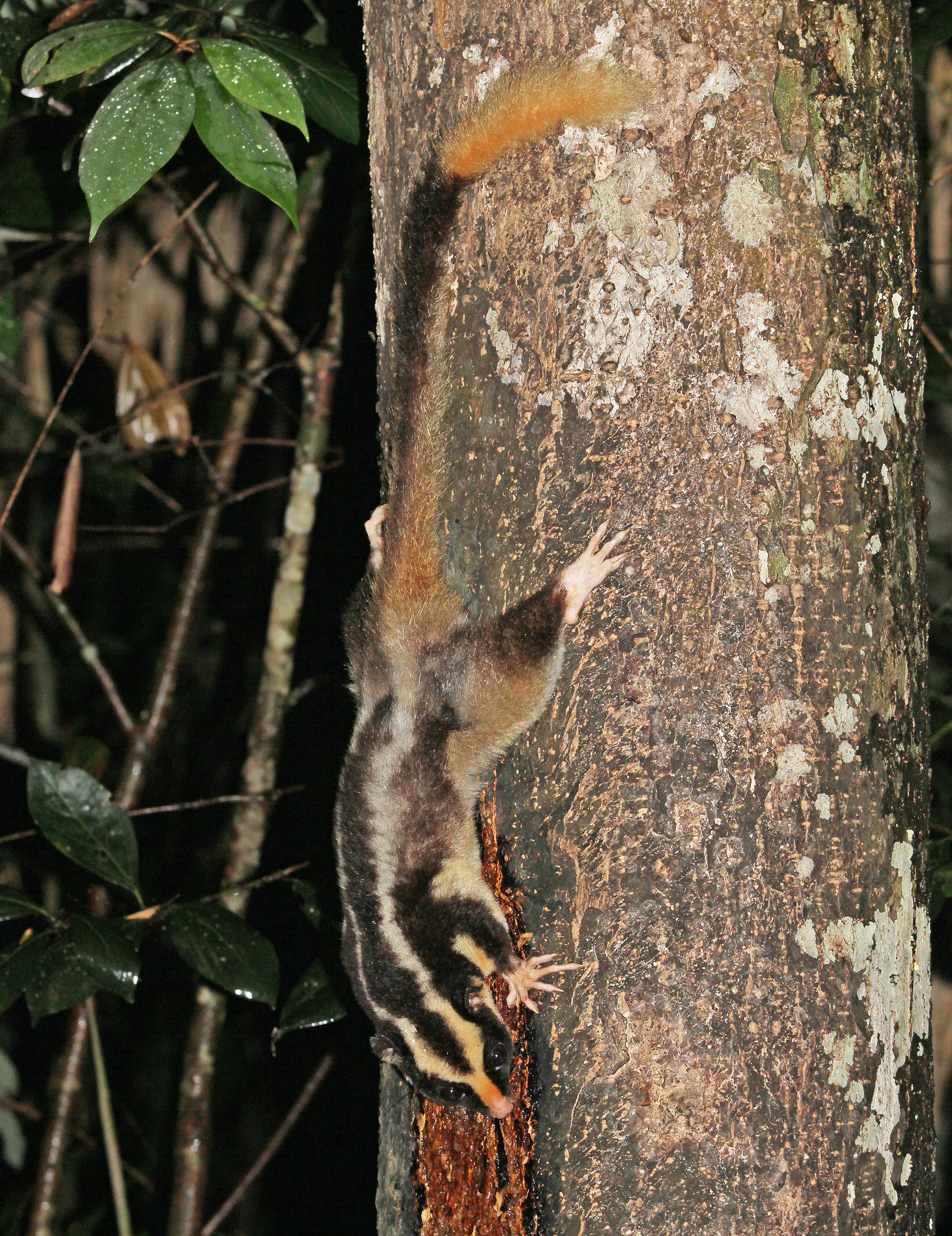
In Crater Lakes National Park, Queensland, Australia

This possum looks like a black and white squirrel. It is solitary, mostly nocturnal, arboreal, and builds nests in tree branches. The body length is approx. 263 mm long, tail 325 mm, and weight 423 g. The striped possum's tail is prehensile. Its fourth finger is elongated relative to the others (like the third finger of the aye-aye, a lemur found in Malagasy rainforests) and is used to take beetles and caterpillars from tree bark, making it a "mammalian woodpecker". Its main diet consists of wood-boring insect larvae, which are extracted from rotten branches by probing with its elongated fourth finger and its powerful incisor teeth which are used to rip open tree bark to expose insects. It detects the larvae by a rapid drumming along branches with the toes of its forefoot. The fourth finger has an unusual hooked nail which it uses to extract insects out of cracks. The striped possum also eats leaves, fruits, and small vertebrates.

It emits a "very powerful unpleasant smell." It is noisy and growls. During the day it curls up on an exposed branch and sleeps.

The female striped possum has two teats in her pouch and can give birth to up to two young. However, not much is known of its breeding habits.

It is most easily found by the sound it makes chewing and drinking in the forest. The striped possum is one of the least known marsupials. The species is not considered to be threatened.
