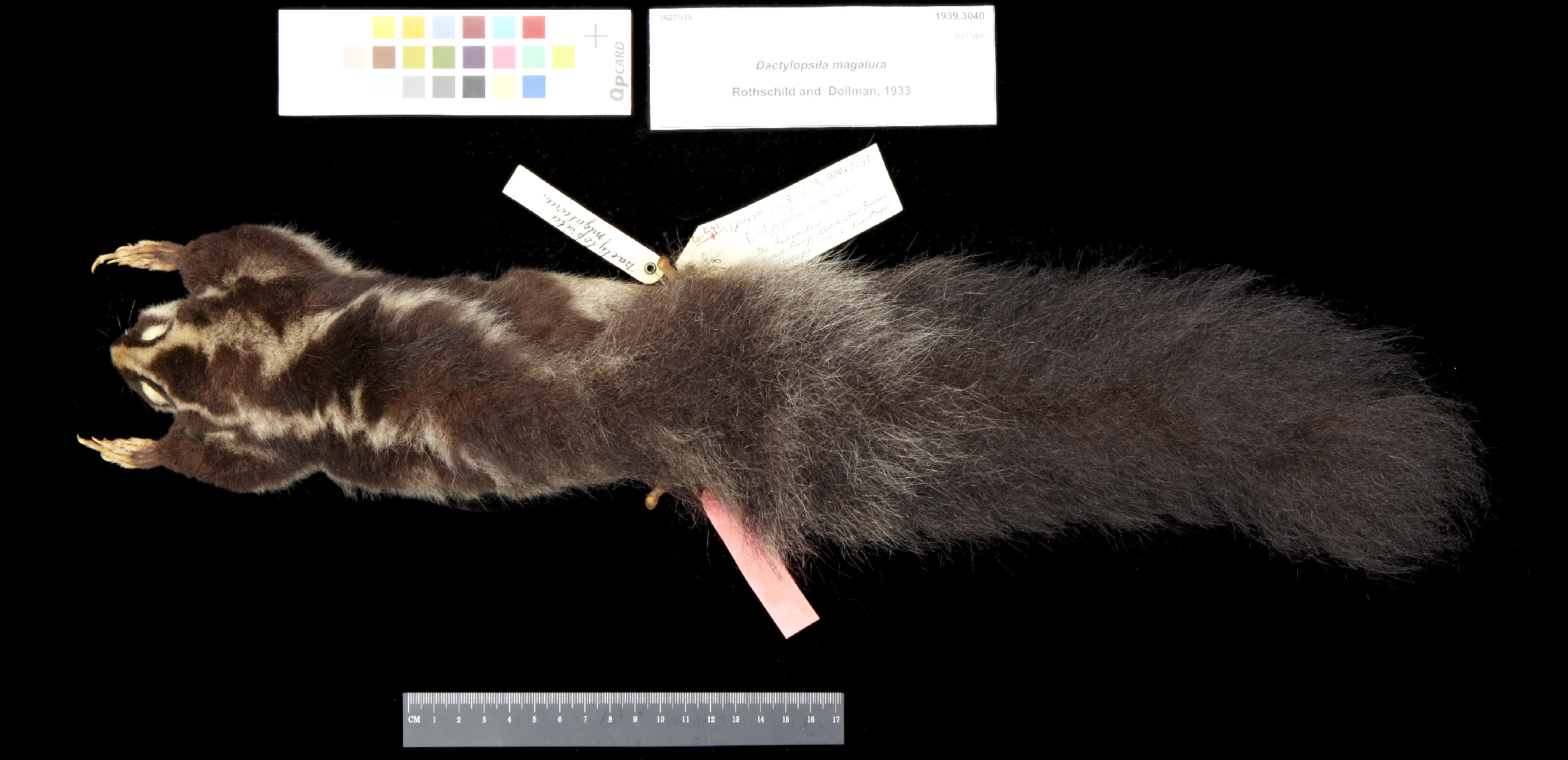
- Dactylopsila megalura

Scientific classification
- Kingdom: Animalia
- Phylum: Chordata
- Class: Mammalia
- Infraclass: Marsupialia
- Order: Diprotodontia
- Family: Petauridae
- Subfamily: Dactylopsilinae
- Genus: Dactylopsila; J. E. Gray, 1858

Type species
- Dactylopsila trivirgata J. E. Gray, 1858

Species
- See text
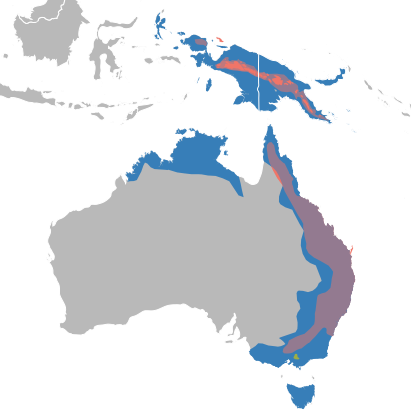
- Distribution rangemap of Petauridae species. Dactylopsila in orange (brighter where Petaurus not present).

= Dactylopsila =

Genus of marsupials

Dactylopsila is a genus of marsupials in the family Petauridae, native to New Guinea, the Cape York peninsula of Australia, and other close islands. Members of this genus are known as trioks or striped possums, though the latter name is usually used for D. trivirgata.

== Species ==
The genus includes the following four species:

- Great-tailed triok, Dactylopsila megalura
- Long-fingered triok, Dactylopsila palpator
- Tate's triok, Dactylopsila tatei
- Striped possum, Dactylopsila trivirgata

In 2026, a species that was thought to be extinct for 6000 years was discovered in New Guinea. Research on this discovery, along with comparisons with other members of this genus, led to a proposal to split this genus into two genera as follows: Dactylopsila would retain D. megalura, D. tatei, and D. trivirgata. Genus Dactylonax would be resurrected with D. palpator as its type, but sensu stricto. Dactylonax ernstmayri, formerly a subspecies of D. palpator, would be elevated to species level, and the rediscovered Dactylonax kambuayai placed in the resurrected genus. In addition, these two genera are combined in subfamily Dactylopsilinae.
