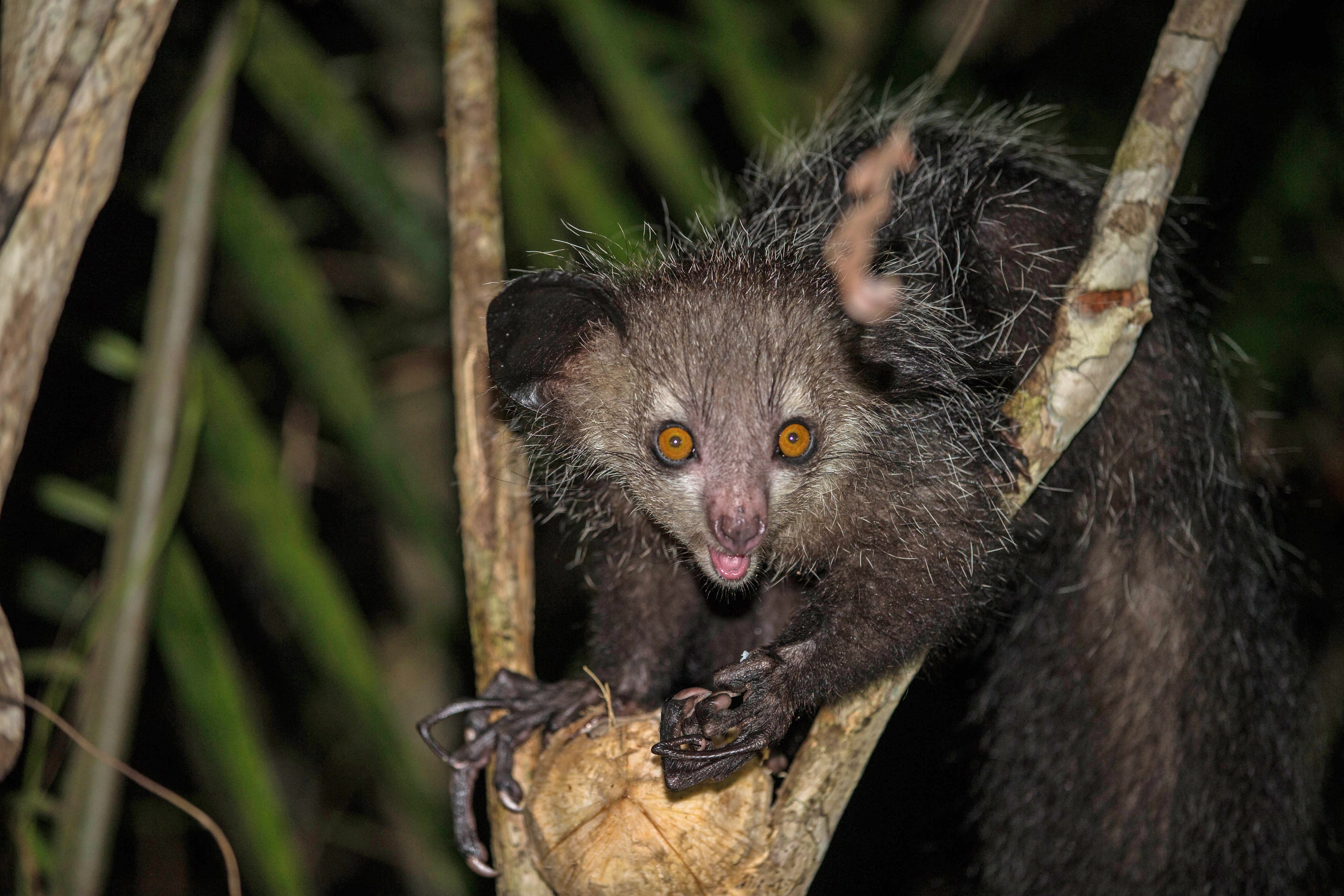

Scientific classification
- Kingdom: Animalia
- Phylum: Chordata
- Class: Mammalia
- Clade: Pan-Primates
- Order: Primates
- Suborder: Strepsirrhini
- Infraorder: Chiromyiformes; Anthony and Coupin, 1931

Families
- Daubetoniidae; †Plesiopithecidae; †Propotto

= Chiromyiformes =

Chiromyiformes Temporal range: late Eocene to the present

Infraorder of lemurs

Chiromyiformes is an infraorder of strepsirrhine primates that includes the aye-aye from Madagascar and its extinct relatives.

== Classification ==
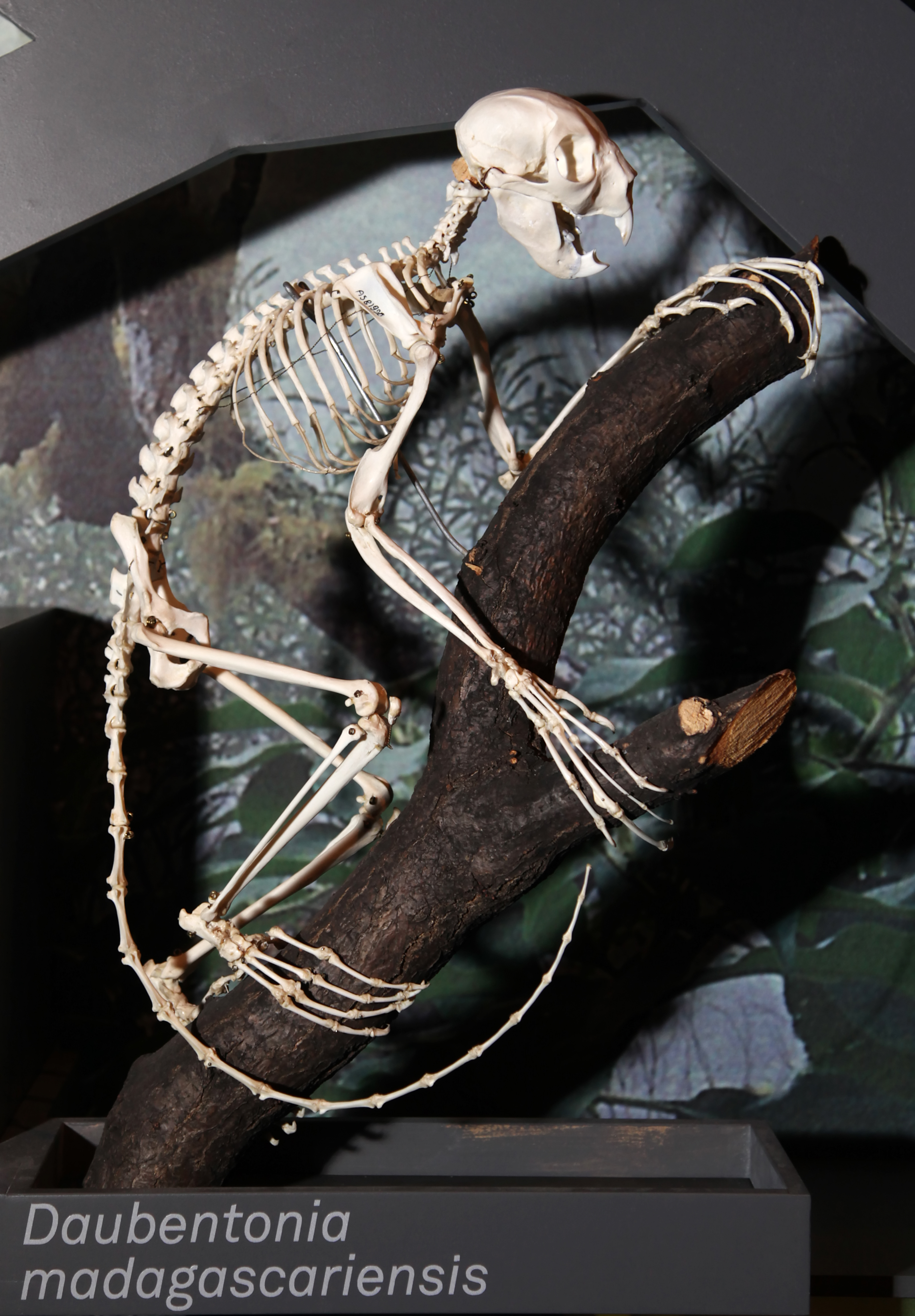
Aye-Aye skeleton

The aye-aye is sometimes classified as a member of Lemuriformes, but others treat Chiromyiformes as a separate infraorder, based on their very reduced dental formula. Gunnell et al. (2018) reclassified the putative bat Propotto as a close relative of the aye-aye, as well as assigning the problematic strepsirrhine primate Plesiopithecus to Chiromyiformes.

== Evolution ==
The molecular clock puts the divergence of Chiromyiformes and Lemuriformes at 50-49 million years ago.
