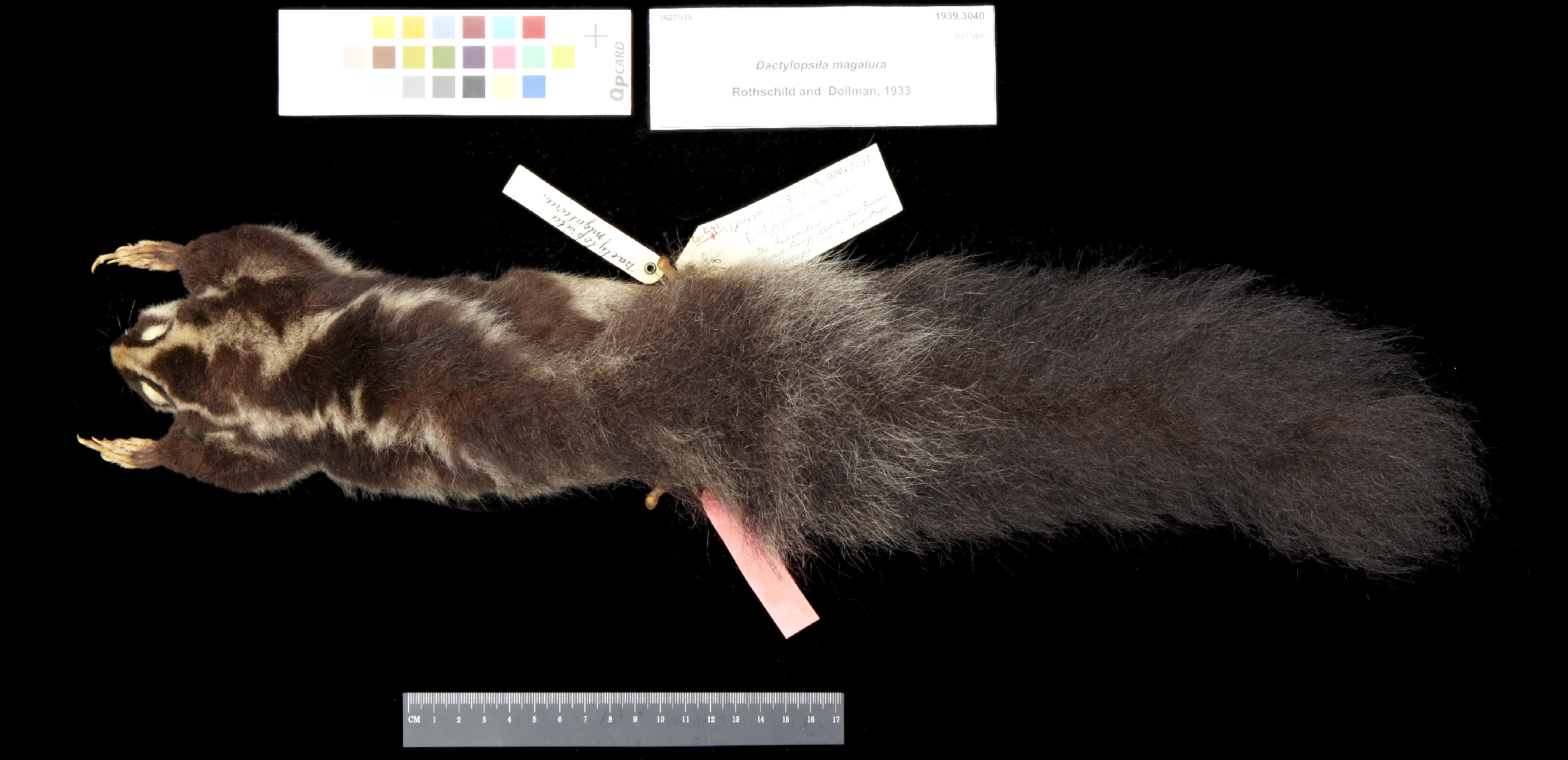

Conservation status
- Least Concern (IUCN 3.1)

Scientific classification
- Kingdom: Animalia
- Phylum: Chordata
- Class: Mammalia
- Infraclass: Marsupialia
- Order: Diprotodontia
- Family: Petauridae
- Genus: Dactylopsila
- Species: D. megalura

Binomial name
- Dactylopsila megalura Rothschild & Dollman, 1932
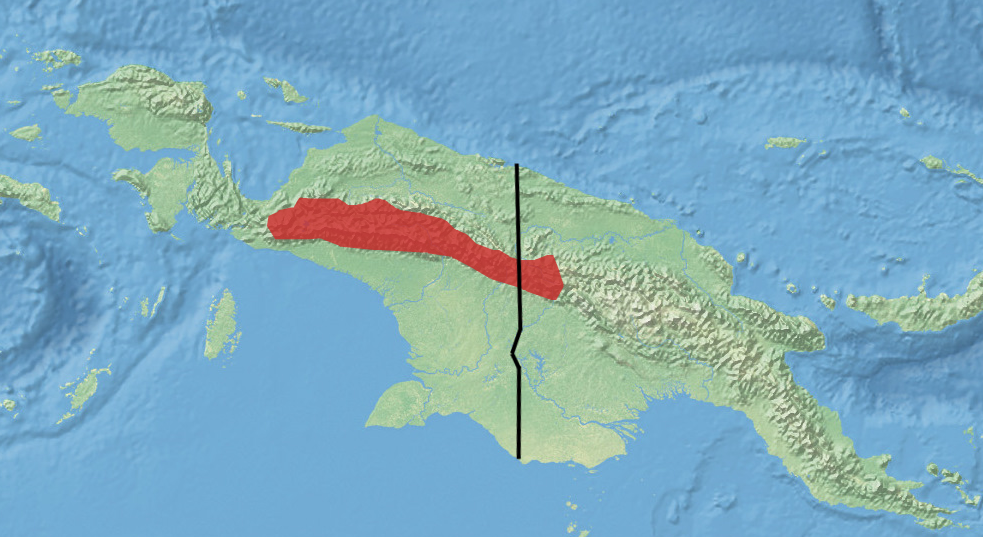
- Distribution of the great-tailed triok

= Great-tailed triok =

Species of marsupial

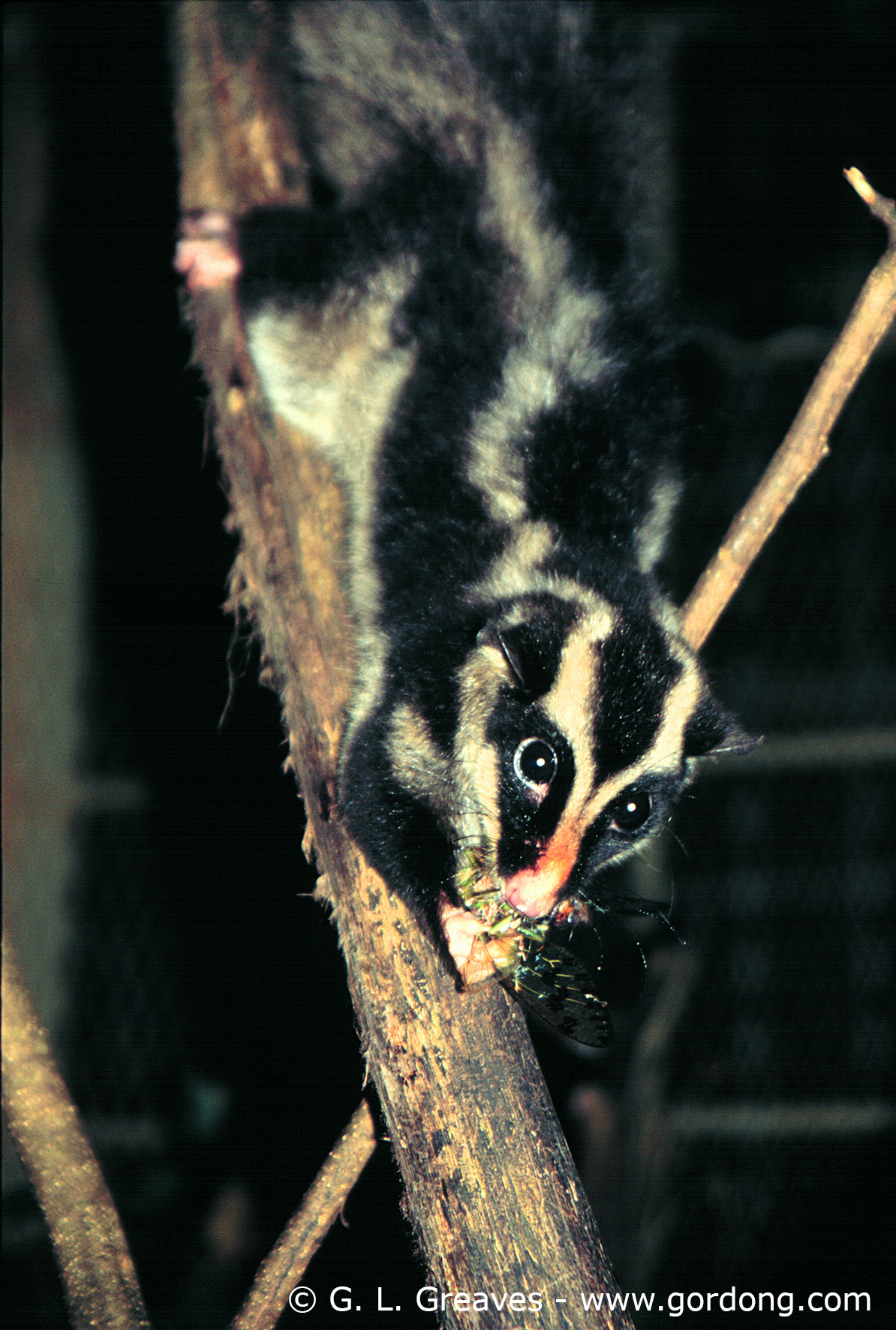
Photographed in West Papua, 1994, by me. Animal was bought from a local tribesman and later released.

The great-tailed triok (Dactylopsila megalura) is a species of marsupial in the family Petauridae. It is found in West Papua and Papua New Guinea. Its natural habitat is subtropical or tropical dry forests.

The great-tailed triok lives in the tropical and subtropical biomes in Australasia. They are also in the family of mammal gliders. The family of gliders have corneal eyes with night vision, because they are also nocturnal mammals. Since the great-tailed triok are omnivores, their diet consists of both plants and animals. The mammal is listed as least threatened and is hunted by local people for food but rarely encountered.
