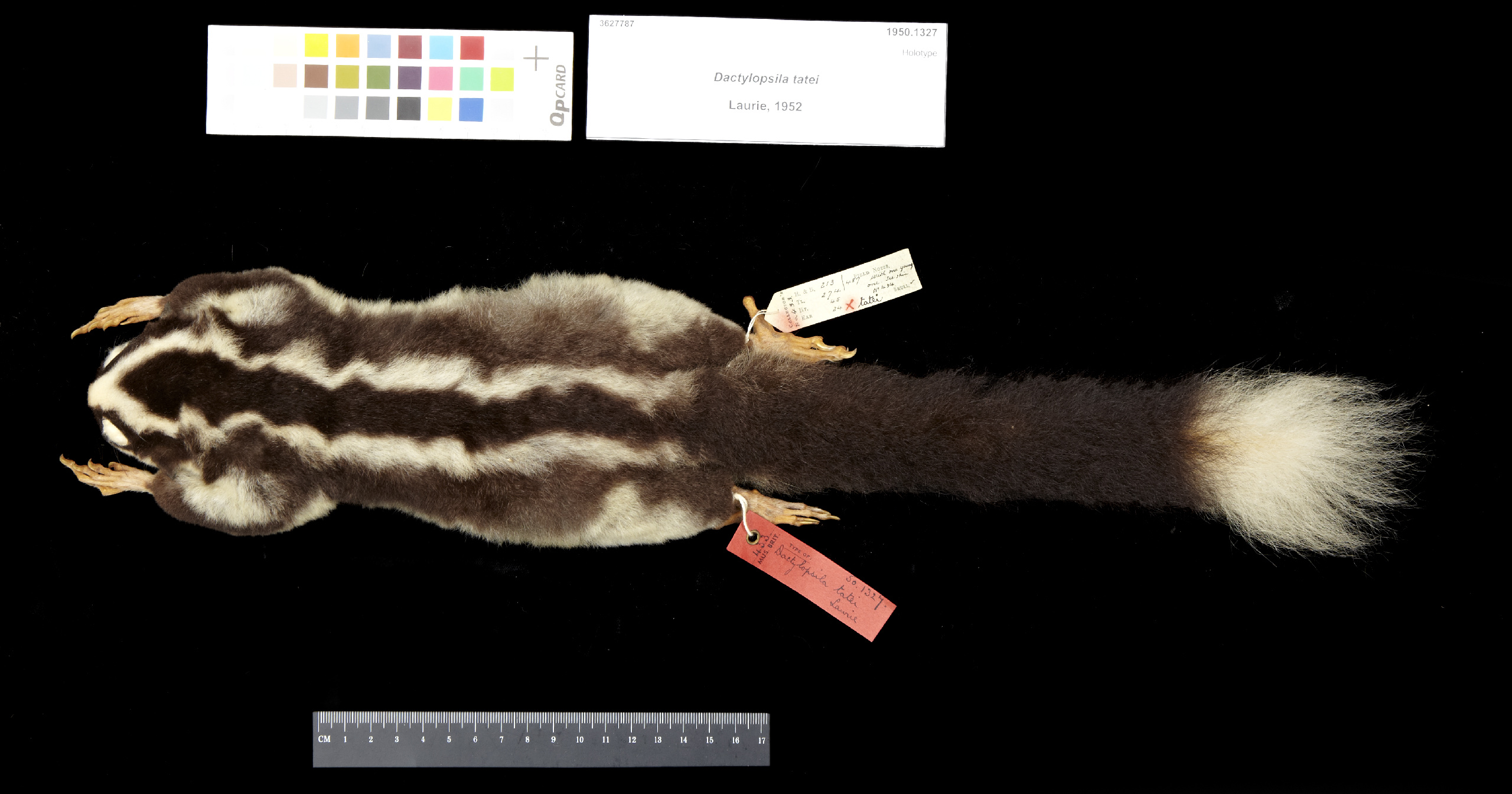

Conservation status
- Endangered (IUCN 3.1)

Scientific classification
- Kingdom: Animalia
- Phylum: Chordata
- Class: Mammalia
- Infraclass: Marsupialia
- Order: Diprotodontia
- Family: Petauridae
- Genus: Dactylopsila
- Species: D. tatei

Binomial name
- Dactylopsila tatei Laurie, 1952
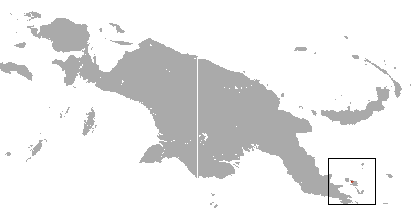
- Tate's triok range

= Tate's triok =

Species of marsupial

Tate's triok, also known as the Fergusson Island striped possum (Dactylopsila tatei), is a species of marsupial in the family Petauridae. It is endemic to Papua New Guinea. Its natural habitat is subtropical or tropical dry forests.

== Lifestyle ==
Tate's triok are arboreal and are rarely found on the forest floor. The species tend to stay in their dry leaf nests in hollows of trees during the day. Tate's triok is also nocturnal and only come out at night to find food. The species are insectivores but can occasionally be found chewing on tree bark or eating fruits and leaves.

== Description ==
Tate's triok is quite small, measuring 12–31 inches (30–79 cm) long and weighing 3–25 ounces (85–709 g). The species usually has black fur with two white stripes that run along its back, resembling a skunk. They also have a short tail with a white coloration at the tip.

== Key Features ==
Tate's triok has many important features that better suit its lifestyle. One feature is that they have an elongated fourth finger, which is used to dig out insect larvae that is burrowed inside the wood. Their fourth finger can also be used to grasp branches in order to keep the rest of the paw open in case they have to manipulate larger prey. In order to find the larvae, the striped possum taps on the wood with a specialized structure that is found on its wrist while listening for the hollow areas of the tree. Tate's triok also has several glands that can secrete chemicals from their body. These chemicals that are produced can create a strong and unpleasant odor which can ward off predators.

== Discovery ==
The first specimen of Tate's triok was found in 1935 by Fred Shaw Mayer. Following its first discovery, no expedition could find the organism from 1950 to 1980, making many believe that the species was extinct. In 1992, another specimen was found, sleeping inside a tree. In order to obtain the animal, the hunter cut down the tree, which resulted in the animal dying.

== Behavior ==
Tate's triok do not form social groups. The species tend to live alone in their trees and can become territorial against other members of their species. Tate's triok will use their unpleasant odor to warn other striped possums to stay out of their area.

== Reproduction ==
Tate's triok, along with other marsupials, do not have well-developed placenta and so their young are born underdeveloped. In order for the organism to survive, the young has to continue to grow in their mother's pouch for a certain amount of time after birth. Each mother only has two teats and so only two offspring can be born at a time to ensure that both babies would get enough nutrients to survive.

== Reasons for endangerment ==
There can be multiple reasons for the organism's small species number. The organism does not have a very large habitat and previous studies have indicated that the species is limited to only this small area in West Fergusson. This small area of land is also used frequently in logging by businesses or hunters. This decrease in trees is lowering the suitable habitats for the Tate's triok which may be lowering the population number as a whole.
