= Kenyasus =

Kenyasus Temporal range: 15.97–11.608 Ma

Scientific classification
- Kingdom: Animalia
- Phylum: Chordata
- Class: Mammalia
- Order: Artiodactyla
- Family: Suidae
- Genus: †Kenyasus; Pickford, 1986

Extinct genus of even-toed ungulates

Kenyasus is an extinct genus of suid that existed in Africa during the Miocene.
