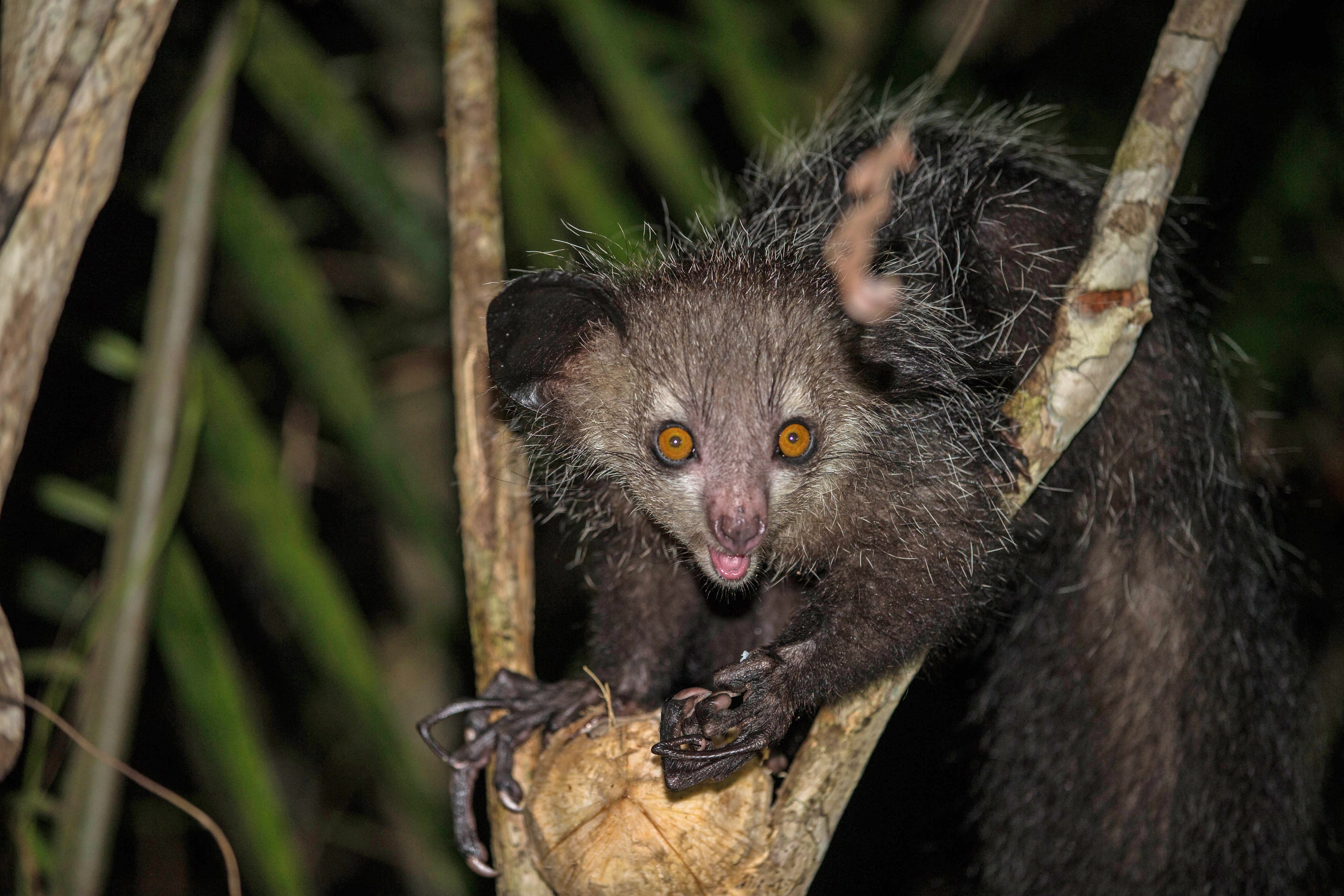

Conservation status
- Endangered (IUCN 3.1)
- CITES Appendix I

Scientific classification
- Kingdom: Animalia
- Phylum: Chordata
- Class: Mammalia
- Order: Primates
- Suborder: Strepsirrhini
- Family: Daubentoniidae
- Genus: Daubentonia
- Species: D. madagascariensis

Binomial name
- Daubentonia madagascariensis (Gmelin, 1788)
- D. madagascariensis distribution

Synonyms
- Species: Daubentonia daubentonii Shaw, 1800; Daubentonia laniger G. Grandidier, 1930; Daubentonia psilodactylus Schreber, 1800

= Aye-aye =

Species of primate

The aye-aye (/ˈaɪ.aɪ/, Daubentonia madagascariensis) is a long-fingered lemur, a strepsirrhine primate native to Madagascar with rodent-like teeth that grow perpetually and a special thin middle finger that it can use to extract grubs and larvae from tree trunks.

It is the world's largest nocturnal primate. It is characterized by its unusual method of finding food: It taps on trees and listens for echoes that signal hollows inside them, which are often infested by grubs, then gnaws holes into the wood using its forward-slanting incisors to create a small hole into which it inserts its narrow middle finger to pull the grubs out. This foraging method is called percussive foraging, and takes up 5–41% of the aye-aye's foraging time. The only other living mammal species known to find food in this way are the striped possum and trioks (genus Dactylopsila) of northern Australia and New Guinea, which are marsupials. From an ecological perspective, the aye-aye fills the niche of a woodpecker, as it is capable of penetrating wood to extract the invertebrates within.

The aye-aye is the only extant member of the genus Daubentonia and family Daubentoniidae. It is currently classified as Endangered by the IUCN. A second species, Daubentonia robusta, appears to have become extinct at some point within the last 1000 years, and is known from subfossil finds.

== Etymology ==
The genus Daubentonia was named after the French naturalist Louis-Jean-Marie Daubenton by his student, Étienne Geoffroy Saint-Hilaire, in 1795. Initially, Geoffroy considered using the Greek name Scolecophagus ("worm-eater") in reference to its eating habits, but he decided against it because he was uncertain about the aye-aye's habits and whether other related species might eventually be discovered. In 1863, British zoologist John Edward Gray coined the family name Daubentoniidae.

The French naturalist Pierre Sonnerat was the first to use the vernacular name "aye-aye" in 1782 when he described and illustrated the lemur, though it was also called the "long-fingered lemur" by English zoologist George Shaw in 1800—a name that did not stick. According to Sonnerat, the name "aye-aye" was a "cri d'exclamation & d'étonnement" (cry of exclamation and astonishment). However, American paleoanthropologist Ian Tattersall noted in 1982 that the name resembles the Malagasy name "hai hai" or "hay hay", (also ahay, aiay, haihay) which refers to the animal and is used around the island. According to Dunkel et al. (2012), the widespread use of the Malagasy name indicates that the name could not have come from Sonnerat. Another hypothesis proposed by Simons and Meyers (2001) is that it derives from "heh heh", which is Malagasy for "I don't know". If correct, then the name might have originated from Malagasy people saying "heh heh" to avoid saying the name of a feared, magical animal.

== Evolutionary history and taxonomy ==
Due to its derived morphological features, the classification of the aye-aye was debated following its discovery. The possession of continually growing incisors (front teeth) parallels those of rodents, leading early naturalists to mistakenly classify the aye-aye within the mammalian order Rodentia and as a squirrel, due to its toes, hair coloring, and tail. However, the aye-aye is also similar to felines in its head shape, eyes, ears and nostrils.

The aye-aye's classification with the order Primates has been just as uncertain. It has been considered a highly derived member of the family Indridae, a basally diverging branch of the strepsirrhine suborder, and of indeterminate relation to all living primates. In 1931, Anthony and Coupin classified the aye-aye under infraorder Chiromyiformes, a sister group to the other strepsirrhines. Colin Groves upheld this classification in 2005 because he was not entirely convinced the aye-aye formed a clade with the rest of the Malagasy lemurs.

However, molecular results have consistently placed Daubentonia as the most basally diverging of lemurs. The most parsimonious explanation for this is that all lemurs are derived from a single ancestor that rafted from Africa to Madagascar during the Paleogene. Similarities in dentition between aye-ayes and several African primate fossils (Plesiopithecus and Propotto) have led to the alternate theory that the ancestors of aye-ayes colonized Madagascar separately from other lemurs. In 2008, Russell Mittermeier, Colin Groves, and others ignored addressing higher-level taxonomy by defining lemurs as monophyletic and containing five living families, including Daubentoniidae.

Further evidence indicating that the aye-aye belongs in the superfamily Lemuroidea can be inferred from the presence of petrosal bullae encasing the ossicles of the ear. The aye-ayes are also similar to lemurs in their shorter back legs.

== Anatomy and morphology ==
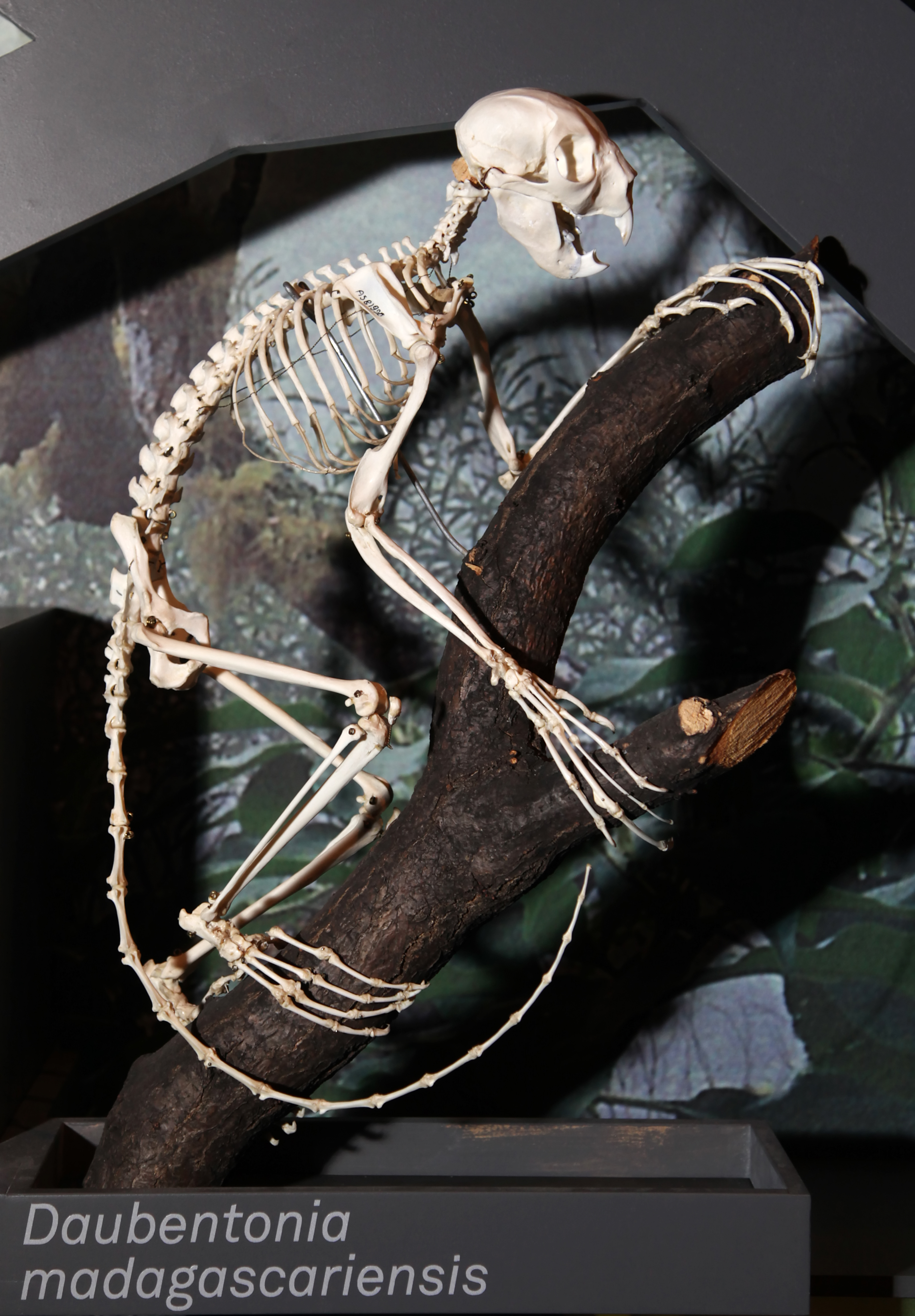
Skeleton

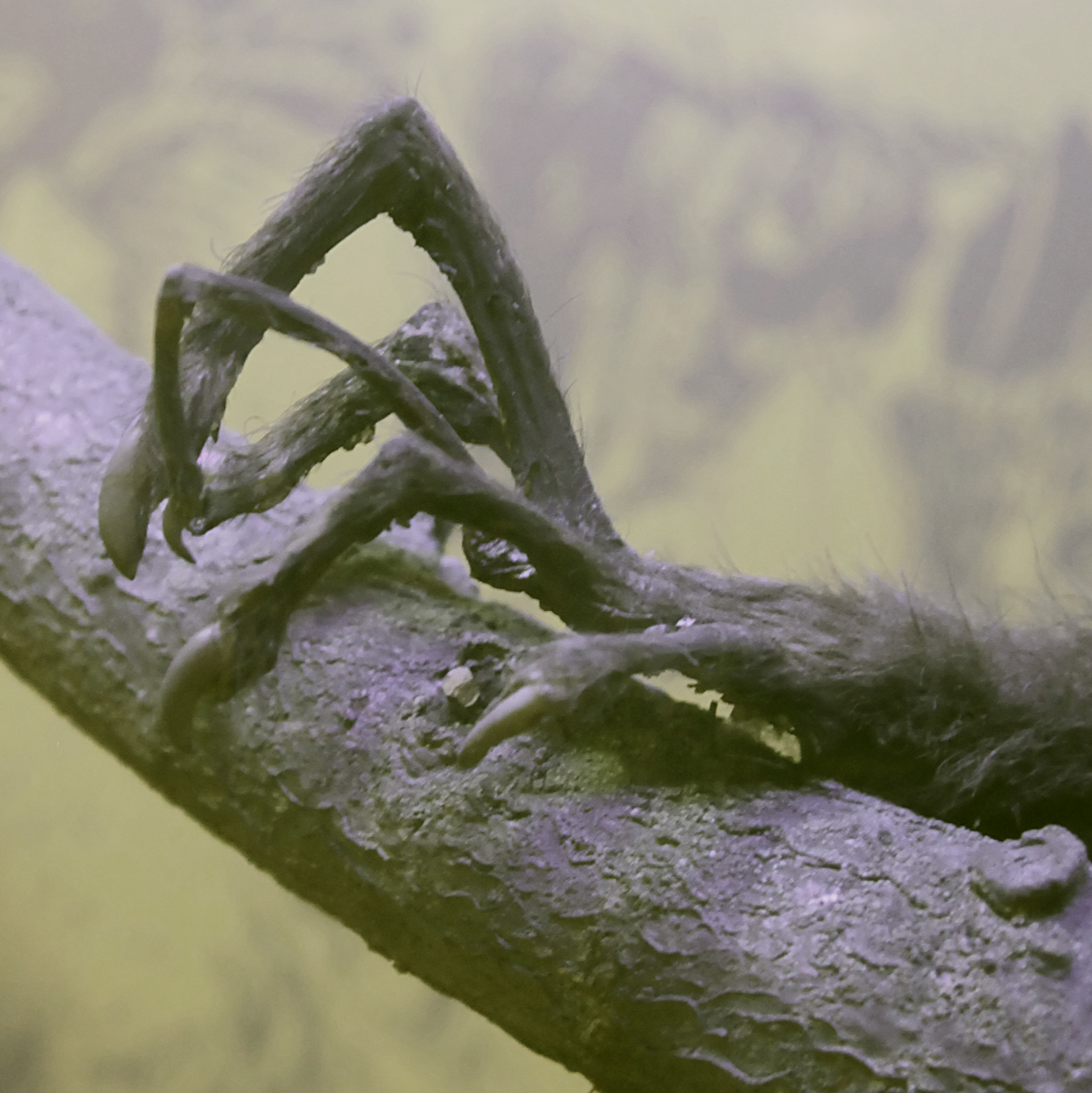
Closeup of the hand showing the elongated digits and the thinner third digit

3d scan of the skull of Daubentonia madagascariensis

3d scan of the left hand of Daubentonia madagascariensis

A full-grown aye-aye is typically about 60 centimetres (2 feet) long with a tail longer than its body. The species has an average head and body length of 36–43 cm (14–17 in) plus a tail of 56–61 cm (22–24 in), and weighs around 2 kilograms (4 pounds).

Young aye-ayes typically are silver colored on their front and have a stripe down their back. However, as the aye-ayes begin to reach maturity, their bodies will be completely covered in thick fur and are typically not one solid color. On the head and back, the ends of the hair are typically tipped with white while the rest of the body will ordinarily be a yellow and/or brown color.

Among the aye-aye's signature traits are its fingers. The third finger, which is much thinner than the others, is used for extracting grubs and insects out of trees, using the hooked nail. The finger is unique in the animal kingdom in that it possesses a ball-and-socket metacarpophalangeal joint, which can reach the throat through a nostril and is used for picking their nose and eating the debris (mucophagy) harvested from inside the nose. The aye-aye has also evolved a sixth digit, a pseudothumb, to aid in gripping.

The complex geometry of ridges on the inner surface of aye-aye ears helps it to accurately focus not only echolocation signals by tapping its finger, but also to passively listen for other sounds produced by prey. These ridges can be regarded as the acoustic equivalent of a Fresnel lens, and can be seen in a large variety of unrelated animals, such as lesser galago, bat-eared fox, mouse lemur, and others.

Females have two nipples located in the region of the groin. The male's genitalia are similar to those of canids, with a large prostate and long baculum.

== Behaviour and lifestyle ==
The aye-aye is a nocturnal and arboreal animal meaning that it spends most of its life high in the trees. Although they are known to come down to the ground on occasion, aye-ayes sleep, eat, travel and mate in the trees and are most commonly found close to the canopy where there is plenty of cover from the dense foliage. During the day, aye-ayes sleep in spherical nests in the forks of tree branches that are constructed out of leaves, branches and vines before emerging after dark to begin their hunt for food. Aye-aye are solitary animals that mark their large home range with scent. The smaller territories of females often overlap those of at least a couple of males. Male aye-ayes tend to share their territories with other males and are even known to share the same nests (although not at the same time), and can seemingly tolerate each other until they hear the call of a female that is looking for a mate.

Mating season extends throughout the year, with females typically starting to breed at the age of three or four. They give birth to one offspring every two to three years. During the period of parenting, a female becomes the dominant figure over males, likely to secure better access to food while caring for her young. The infant remains in a nest for up to two months before venturing out, but it takes another seven months before the young aye-aye can maneuver the canopy as skillfully as an adult.

=== Diet and foraging ===
The aye-aye is an omnivore and commonly eats seeds, nuts, fruits, nectar, plant exudates and fungi, but also xylophagous, or wood boring, insect larvae (especially cerambycid beetle larvae) and honey. Aye-ayes tap on the trunks and branches of trees at a rate of up to eight times per second, and listen to the echo produced to find hollow chambers. Studies have suggested that the acoustic properties associated with the foraging cavity have no effect on excavation behavior. Once a chamber is found, they chew a hole into the wood and get grubs out of that hole with their highly adapted narrow and bony middle fingers. The aye-aye begins foraging between 30 minutes before and three hours after sunset. Up to 80% of the night is spent foraging in the canopy, separated by occasional rest periods. It climbs trees by making successive vertical leaps, much like a squirrel. Horizontal movement is more difficult, but the aye-aye rarely descends to jump to another tree, and can often travel up to 4 km (2 1/2 mi) a night.

Though foraging is usually solitary, they occasionally forage in groups. Individual movements within the group are coordinated using both vocalisations and scent signals.

Throughout the wet season, the aye-aye is known to spend up to 20% of its time feeding on the nectar of Ravenala madagascariensis. Other than Homininae, it is the only known primate to possess the (A294V) mutation on the encoding gene for alcohol dehydrogenase class IV enzyme, which is known to drastically improve the enzyme's efficiency. A 2016 study showed that the aye-aye is able to differentiate between different alcohol concentrations in nectar and showed a clear preference towards the higher concentrations. This suggests that in the wild, it is able and likely to consume fermented nectar and that its ability to metabolize alcohol might have been an evolutionary advantage.

=== Social systems ===
The aye-aye is classically considered 'solitary' as they have not been observed to groom each other in the wild, and in captivity do not do so to the extent of other lemur species. However, recent research suggests that it is more social than once thought. It usually sticks to foraging in its own personal home range, or territory. The home ranges of males often overlap, and the males can be very social with each other. Female home ranges never overlap, though a male's home range often overlaps that of several females. The male aye-ayes live in large areas up to 32 hectares (80 acres), while females have smaller living spaces that go up to 8.1 hectares (20 acres). It is difficult for the males to defend a singular female because of the large home range. They are seen exhibiting polygyny because of this. Regular scent marking with their cheeks and neck is how aye-ayes let others know of their presence and repel intruders from their territory.

Like many other prosimians, the female aye-aye is dominant to the male. They are not typically monogamous, and will often challenge each other for mates. Male aye-ayes are very assertive in this way, and sometimes even pull other males away from a female during mating. Males are normally locked to females during mating in sessions that may last up to an hour. Outside of mating, males and females interact only occasionally, usually while foraging. The aye-aye is thought to be the only primate which uses echolocation to find its prey.

== Distribution and habitat ==
The aye-aye lives primarily on the east coast of Madagascar. Its natural habitat is rainforest or dry deciduous forest, but many live in cultivated areas due to deforestation. Rainforest aye-ayes, the most common, dwell in canopy areas, and are usually sighted above 70 meters altitude. They sleep during the day in nests built from interwoven twigs and dead leaves up in the canopy among the vines and branches.

== Conservation ==
The aye-aye was thought to be extinct in 1933, but was rediscovered in 1957. In 1966, nine individuals were transported to Nosy Mangabe, an island near Maroantsetra off eastern Madagascar. Recent research shows the aye-aye is more widespread than was previously thought, but its conservation status was changed to endangered in 2014. This is for four main reasons: the aye-aye is considered evil by local cultures, and is killed as such. The forests of Madagascar are declining in range due to deforestation. Local farmers will kill aye-ayes to protect their crops; aye-aye poaching is another major issue. However, there is no direct evidence to suggest aye-ayes pose any legitimate threat to crops and therefore are killed based on superstition.

=== Folk belief ===
The aye-aye is often viewed as a harbinger of evil and death and killed on sight. Others believe, if one points its narrowest finger at someone, they are marked for death. Some say that the appearance of an aye-aye in a village predicts the death of a villager, and the only way to prevent this is to kill it. The Sakalava people go so far as to claim aye-ayes sneak into houses through the thatched roofs and murder the sleeping occupants by using their middle fingers to puncture their victims' aorta.

=== Captive breeding ===
The conservation of this species has been aided by captive breeding, primarily at the Duke Lemur Center in Durham, North Carolina. This center has been influential in keeping, researching and breeding aye-ayes and other lemurs, including how they develop through infancy. They have also revolutionized the understanding of the aye-aye diet. Jersey Zoo also plays a big role in the conservation of the species. After importing six aye-ayes from the wild in 1990, they achieved the world's first captive breeding in 1992. They also keep the international studbook of the species and manage the European breeding programmme.

As many as 50 aye-ayes were in zoological facilities worldwide in 2010; this had increased to 62 by 2016.

== Gallery ==
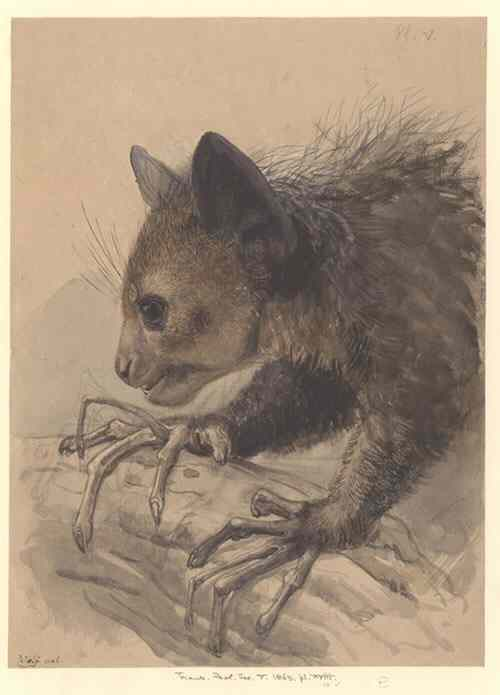
An aye-aye foraging, c. 1863, Joseph Wolf

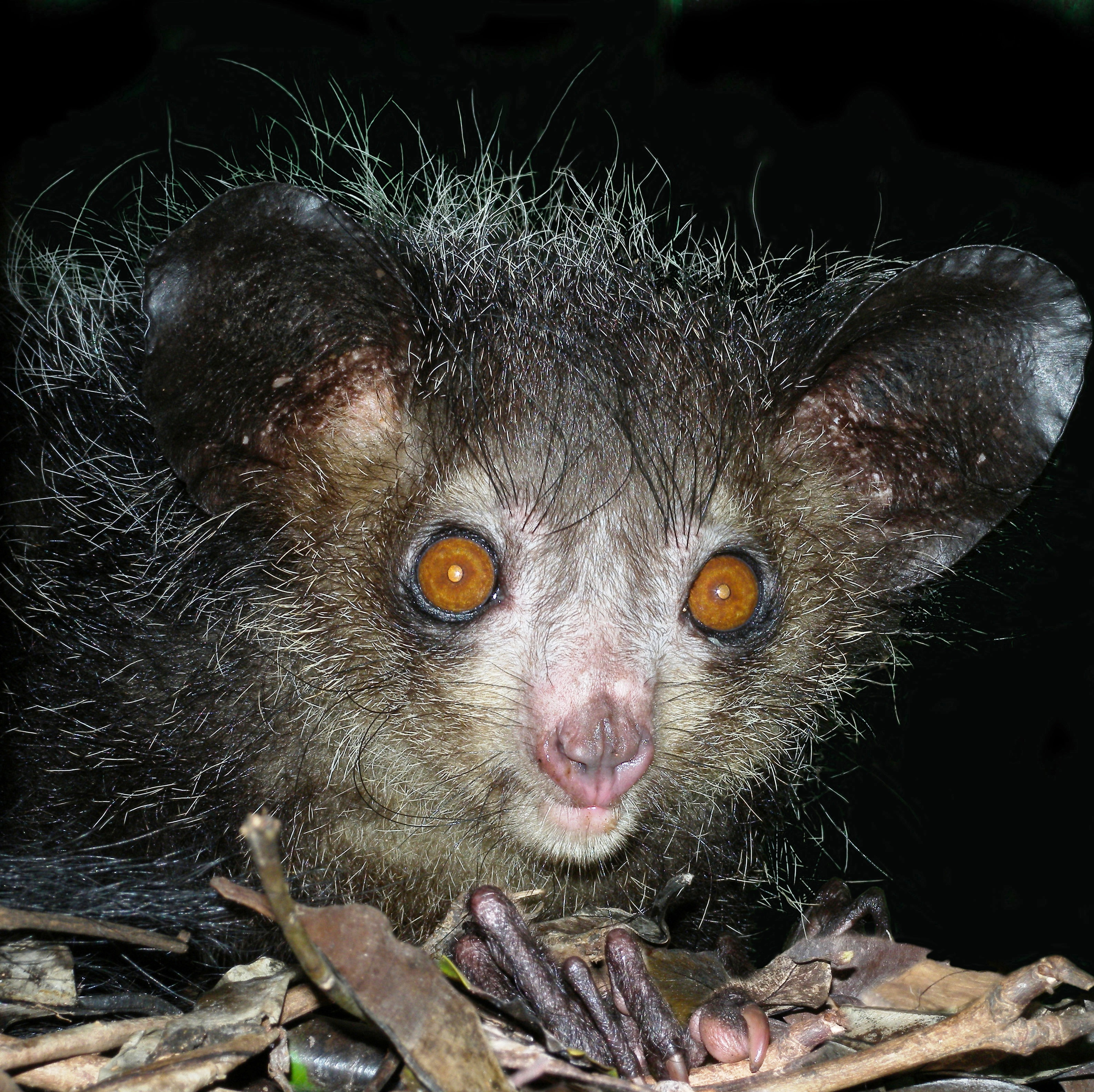
Aye-ayes are nocturnal.

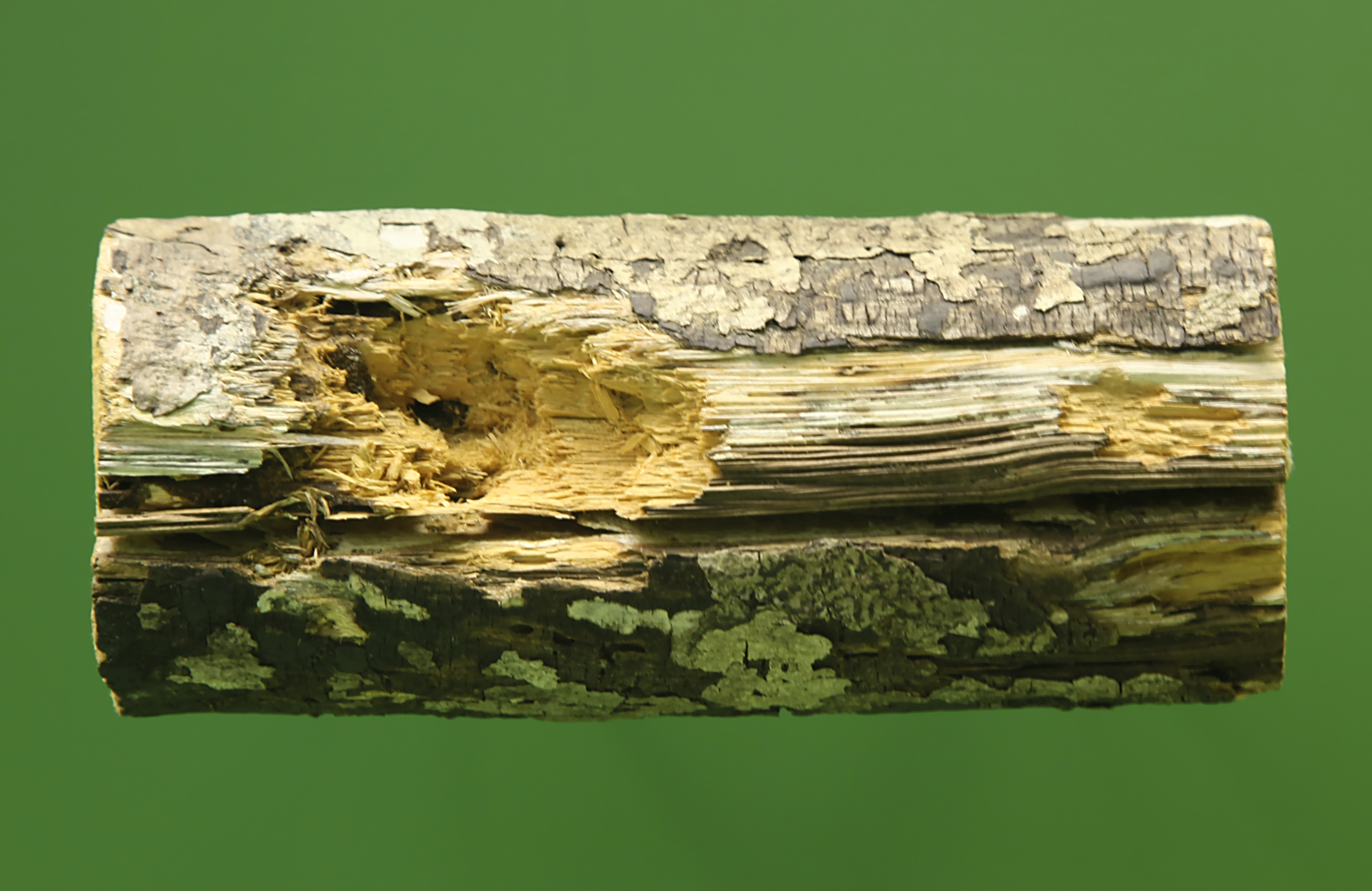
Gnawed limb by an aye-aye to prey on larvae

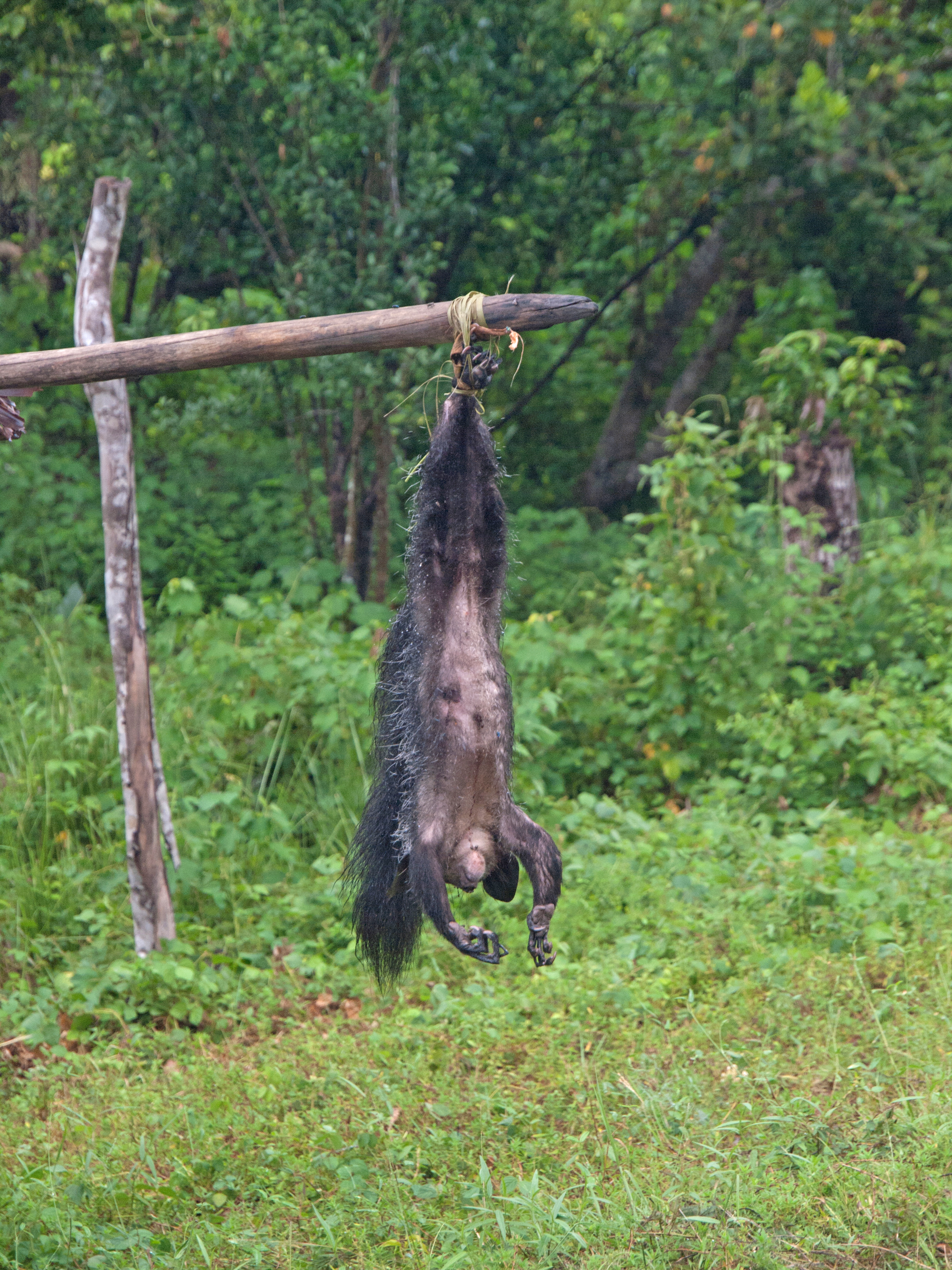
Aye-ayes are commonly thought to be bad omens by some of the Malagasy people, although other legends consider them a good omen. When spotted, they are killed on sight and hung up so that the evil spirit will be carried away by travelers.

== Literature cited ==
- Ankel-Simons, F. (2007). Primate Anatomy (3rd ed.). Academic Press. ISBN 978-0-12-372576-9.
- Beck, R.M.D. (2009). "Was the Oligo-Miocene Australian metatherian Yalkaparidon a 'mammalian woodpecker'?". Biological Journal of the Linnean Society. 97 (1): 1–17. doi:10.1111/j.1095-8312.2009.01171.x.
- Groves, C. P. (2005). "Order Primates". In Wilson, D. E.; Reeder, D. M (eds.). Mammal Species of the World: A Taxonomic and Geographic Reference (3rd ed.). Johns Hopkins University Press. pp. 111–184. ISBN 978-0-8018-8221-0. OCLC 62265494.
- Mittermeier, R.A.; Louis, E.E.; Richardson, M.; Schwitzer, C.; et al. (2010). Lemurs of Madagascar. Illustrated by S.D. Nash (3rd ed.). Conservation International. ISBN 978-1-934151-23-5. OCLC 670545286.
- Nowak, R.M. (1999). Walker's Primates of the World (6th ed.). Baltimore, Maryland: Johns Hopkins University Press. ISBN 978-0-8018-6251-9.
- Piper, Ross (2007). Extraordinary Animals: An Encyclopedia of Curious and Unusual Animals. Greenwood Press. pp. 64–65. ISBN 978-0-313-33922-6.
- Sterling, E. (2003). "Daubentonia madagascariensis, Aye-aye, Aye-aye". In Goodman, S.M.; Benstead, J.P. (eds.). The Natural History of Madagascar. University of Chicago Press. pp. 1348–1351. ISBN 978-0-226-30306-2.
- Yoder, A.D.; Vilgalys, R.; Ruvolo, M. (1996). "Molecular evolutionary dynamics of cytochrome b in strepsirrhine primates: The phylogenetic significance of third-position transversions". Molecular Biology and Evolution. 13 (10): 1339–1350. doi:10.1093/oxfordjournals.molbev.a025580. PMID 8952078.
