= Propotto =

Propotto Temporal range: Early Miocene

Scientific classification
- Kingdom: Animalia
- Phylum: Chordata
- Class: Mammalia
- Order: Primates
- Suborder: Strepsirrhini
- Infraorder: Lemuriformes
- Superfamily: Lemuroidea
- Genus: †Propotto; Simpson, 1967
- Species: †P. leakeyi

Binomial name
- †Propotto leakeyi Simpson, 1967

Extinct genus of primates

Propotto is an extinct monotypic genus of strepsirrhine primate from the Early Miocene of Kenya. It contains one described species, Propotto leakeyi. Although long considered a pteropodid fruit-eating bat after spending a brief sojourn as a prehistoric relative of lorises, recent research shows it to be an extinct relative of the aye-aye.

Simpson (1967) described Propotto on the basis of mandibles from Early Miocene deposits in Kenya that he regarded as constituting an extinct relative of the extant potto, hence the genus meaning "before Potto". However, the lorisid classification of Propotto was questioned by Walker (1969), who argued that it represented a fruit bat of the family Pteropodidae, noting that the second premolar was smaller than those of lorises and that the mandibular corpus was also unlike those of lorisiforms in deepening anteriorly and having a deep masseteric fossa (Simpson accepted Walker's refutation of the lorisid placement of Propotto). Several authors accepted the chiropteran classification of Propotto (although Butler 1984 did note that Propotto has an enlarged anterior lower tooth that is relatively larger than the lower canines of pteropodid fruit bats); Butler (1984) placed Propotto in a new subfamily of Pteropodidae, Propottinae.

In a paper published in 2018, the late Gregg Gunnell and his colleagues cast doubt on the pteropodid classification of Propotto, noting that features cited by Walker (1969) to exclude the genus from Lorisidae are also found in the Eocene strepsirrhine Plesiopithecus from the Fayum Depression, Egypt. For example, they pointed out that the laterally compressed and presumably highly procumbent lower anterior tooth excluded Propotto from Chiroptera and instead occurs in Plesiopithecus and the aye-aye. The results of the cladistic analysis of Gunnell et al. (2018) recovered Propotto as the most basal member of Chiromyiformes, supporting the hypothesis that lemurs migrated to Madagascar in two distinct waves from Africa, perhaps in the late Cenozoic.

== Palaeobiology ==
Propotto was recovered as most likely being a frugivore by quantitative study of its tooth shape using both discriminant function analysis and Bayesian multilevel modelling.
