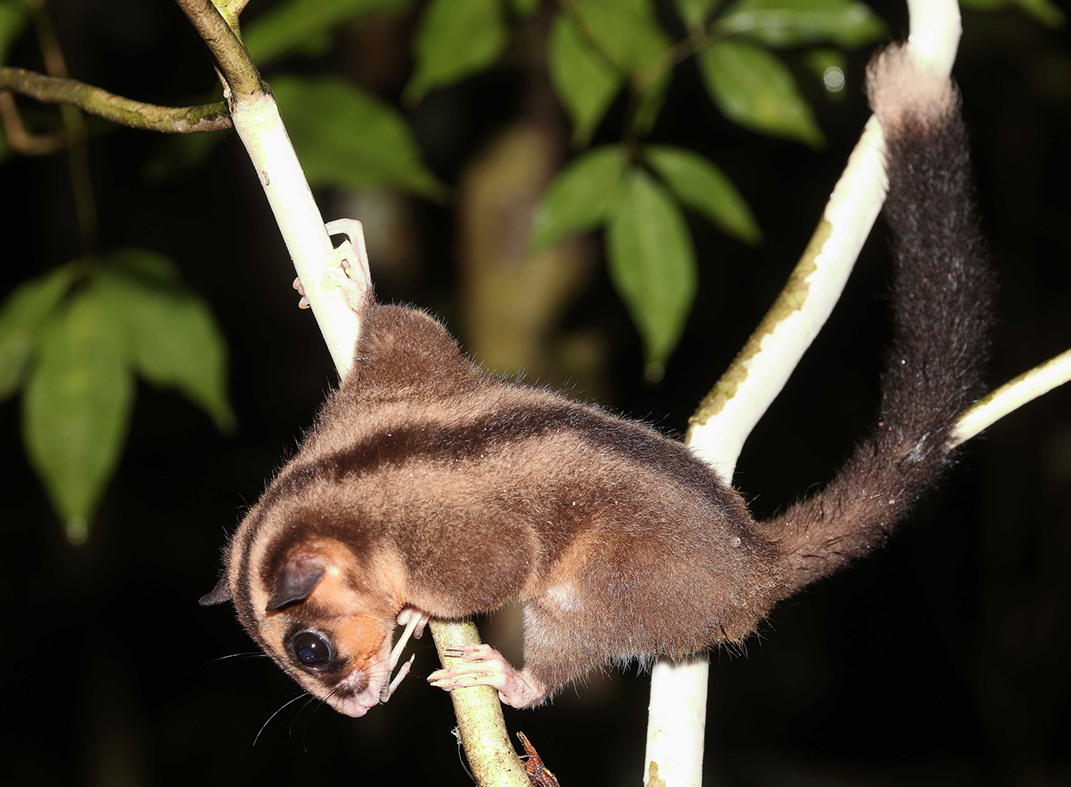

Scientific classification
- Kingdom: Animalia
- Phylum: Chordata
- Class: Mammalia
- Infraclass: Marsupialia
- Order: Diprotodontia
- Family: Petauridae
- Genus: Dactylonax
- Species: D. kambuayai

Binomial name
- Dactylonax kambuayai (Aplin, 1999)

Synonyms
- Dactylopsila kambuayai Aplin, 1999

= Dactylonax kambuayai =

Dactylonax kambuayai Temporal range: Late Holocene to Recent, ~0.006–0 Ma

Species of marsupial

Dactylonax kambuayai, the Arfak triok or pygmy long-fingered triok, is a member of the marsupial family Petauridae. Fossils of the species were discovered in the 1990s, but the species was believed to be extinct until it was discovered still living in the wild by a collaboration of scientists, indigenous communities, and citizen scientists in 2026.

It has been described as being a Lazarus taxon.

== Description ==
The animal grows to about 17.6 cm (6.9 in) in length (not including an 18 cm (7.1 in) tail). It is striped in black and white and has a very long fourth digit on its hand that is used to hunt wood-boring beetle larvae out of wood.

In 2026, the animal was found by researchers led by the Australian scientist Tim Flannery on the Bird's Head Peninsula (also known as Vogelkop Peninsula) of Western New Guinea, in Indonesia.
