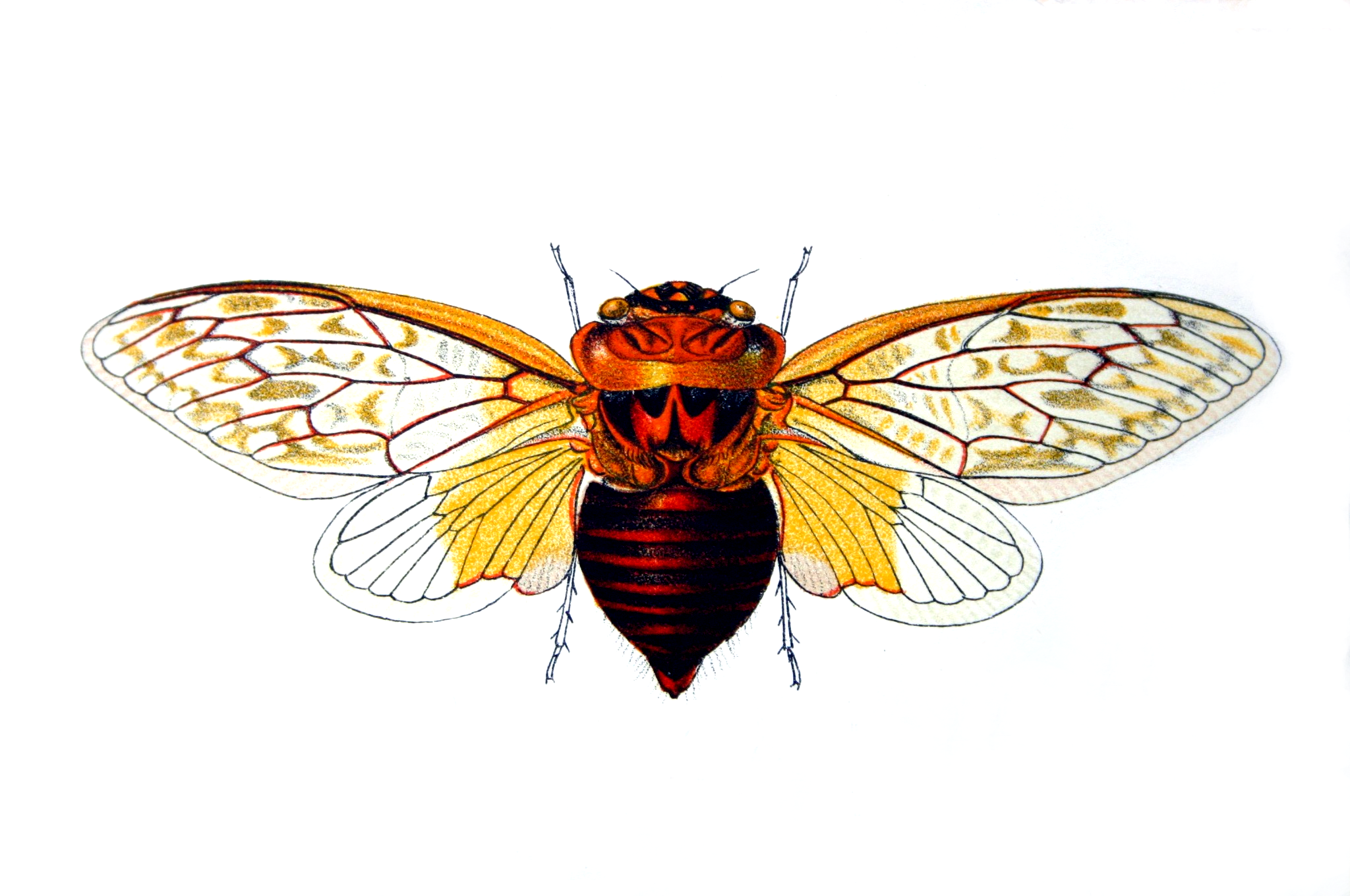

Scientific classification
- Domain: Eukaryota
- Kingdom: Animalia
- Phylum: Arthropoda
- Class: Insecta
- Order: Hemiptera
- Suborder: Auchenorrhyncha
- Family: Cicadidae
- Subfamily: Cicadinae
- Tribe: Platypleurini
- Genus: Dyticopycna
- Species: D. sylvia

Binomial name
- Dyticopycna sylvia Distant, 1899

Synonyms
- Pycna sylvia (Distant, 1899); Platypleura sylvia (Distant, 1899)

= Dyticopycna sylvia =

Species of true bug

Dyticopycna sylvia is a species of cicada endemic to South Africa. It was first described and named by William Lucas Distant in 1899 in the Annals and Magazine of Natural History. Insecta transvaaliensia was self-published by Distant and appeared in twelve parts over the period 1900-1911. The series was an account of Distant's insect-collecting trips through the Transvaal. The collected parts were published as a single volume after Distant's death by Francis Edwards of London in 1924. This species has been placed previously in Pycna and Platypleura before a revision in 2020.

Specimens of this species were collected in 1906 and then not found again in the field until 2001 "when small, localised populations were discovered during a faunal survey for the Environmental Management Programme Report for the Anglo Platinum Der Brochen Platinum project in the Groot Dwars River valley, Mpumalanga." - Platypleura sylvia As a result a behavioural study was carried out in the Groot Dwars River valley in 2001 and 2002, during which researchers found that the adult life stage of the insect lasted six to eight weeks during the months of November and December, and that its distribution is extremely localised and confined to a number of valleys in Sekhukhuneland. This cicada is found in closed bushveld that includes the tree Vitex obovata, a member of the Verbenaceae, a tree also endemic to South Africa and Eswatini, and with which it has a close and exclusive relationship. A number of cicadas have evolved this affinity for a single species of tree. Researchers observed a female drilling holes in a dry twig and depositing her eggs. Males spread their wings and arch their backs when calling, a posture which is believed to amplify their call, best described as "zeep".

Cicada nymphs were found down to 50 centimetres (20 in) below the soil surface attached to the roots of Vitex obovata and exuviae were found above ground on trees of the same species housing calling adults, and on other plant species when no adults were present. The duration of the larval stage is as yet undetermined, but is thought to be something of the order of six or seven years underground.

Dyticopycna sylvia is confined to the valley of the Groot Dwars River (24°55′ S, 30°05′ E), a tributary of the Steelpoort River, and occurs on the farms Helena, Der Brochen, Mareesburg and also the Didingwe River Lodge property, with a slight spill-over to neighbouring areas. The species' tragedy is its occurrence on geological formations rich in platinum. The area is actively mined by the Anglo American Platinum Corporation committed to "minimising its environmental impact at this operation by implementing best practice in land and environmental management". Other mining companies dismiss concerns by stating that the species is "rare but not on IUCN Red List due to insufficient data", ignoring its disappearance for almost a century and equating "insufficient data" with a licence to act irresponsibly.
