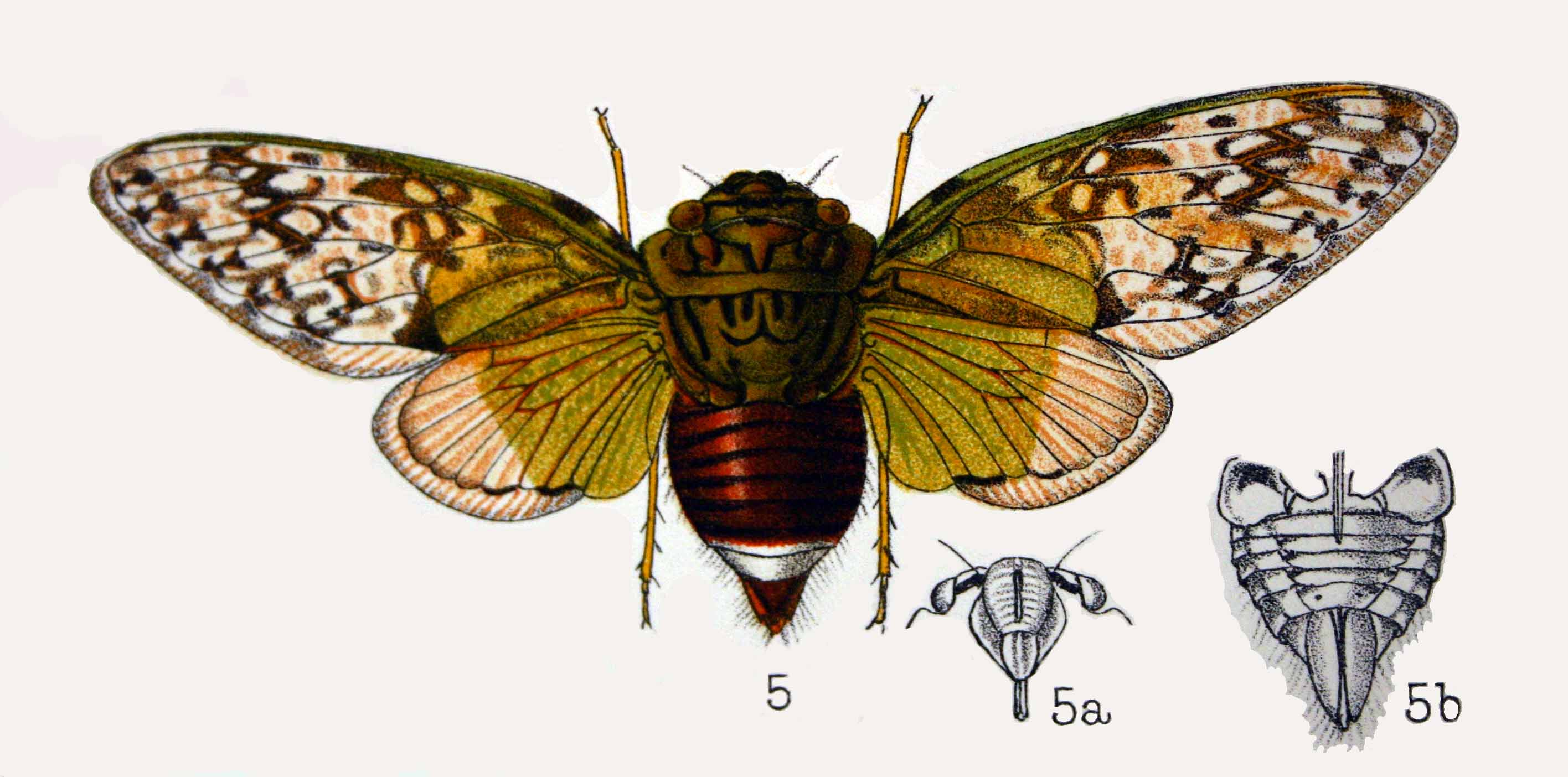
- Dyticopycna semiclara from "Insecta transvaaliensia" by Distant
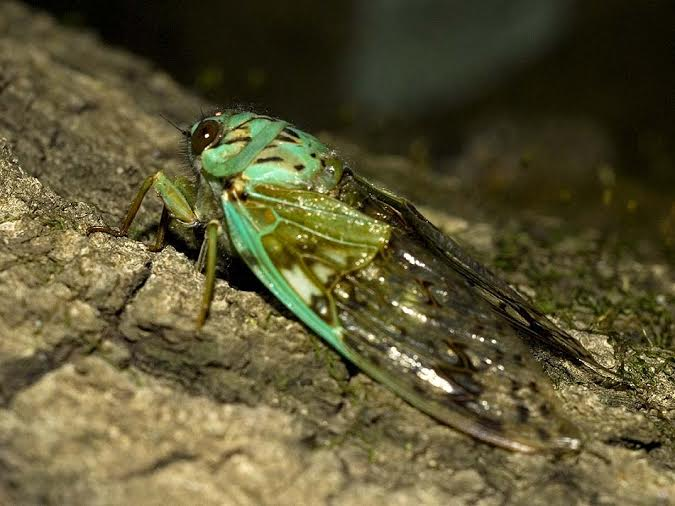
- Dyticopycna semiclara

Scientific classification
- Domain: Eukaryota
- Kingdom: Animalia
- Phylum: Arthropoda
- Class: Insecta
- Order: Hemiptera
- Suborder: Auchenorrhyncha
- Family: Cicadidae
- Genus: Dyticopycna
- Species: D. semiclara

Binomial name
- Dyticopycna semiclara (Germar, 1834)

Synonyms
- Cicada semiclara Germar, 1834; Platypleura basifolia Walker, 1850; Platypleura semiclara Stål, 1866; Pycna semiclara (Germar, 1834)

= Dyticopycna semiclara =

Species of true bug

Dyticopycna semiclara, the whining forest cicada, is a South African forest-dwelling platypleurine cicada; it is the type species of the genus Dyticopycna, having been placed previously in Pycna and other genera before revision in 2020.

One of the largest cicadas in South Africa, this species reaches 40–50 mm in length. Its wings display green, brown, and translucent patches, and are covered with silvery hairs. It is endemic to South Africa and occurs in the Eastern Cape, KwaZulu-Natal, Mpumalanga, and Limpopo provinces. It prefers indigenous forests, where the undergrowth is sparse and trees are more than 4m tall, but may also be found in stands of Quercus robur, Populus deltoides, pine, and eucalyptus.

It is also unusually found in dense riverine bushes in KwaZulu-Natal and Eastern Cape. Males usually call from a position a few meters above the ground on a shady limb of a tree, with a good view of the immediate surroundings and potential predators. Males often sing in chorus to attract mates, particularly at dusk and dawn, enabled to do this by an endothermic metabolism that rises to more than 22 °C above ambient temperature. This endothermy during crepuscular hours allows the use of optimal atmospheric conditions for acoustic communication and reduces the chances of predation to a minimum. The species also produces an encounter call used in courtship and maintaining personal space within choruses, behaving aggressively to other males venturing closer than about 50 cm. Choruses may start up at any time of the day, but concentrate their calling in a half-hour period at dawn and dusk.
