= Tigripleura =

Scientific classification
- Domain: Eukaryota
- Kingdom: Animalia
- Phylum: Arthropoda
- Class: Insecta
- Order: Hemiptera
- Suborder: Auchenorrhyncha
- Family: Cicadidae
- Tribe: Platypleurini
- Genus: Tigripleura; Lee, 2024
- Species: T. ggoma

Binomial name
- Tigripleura ggoma Lee, 2024

Monotypic genus of cicadas

Tigripleura is a monotypic genus of Asian cicadas in the tribe Platypleurini, erected by Young June Lee in 2024.

== Species ==
The sole species is Tigripleura ggoma; the holotype specimens were found in Quảng Bình province, at 800–1,200 m. above sea level and to date this species has only been recorded from central Vietnam. Lee named the genus from the Latin 'tigris' meaning tiger and the similar (type genus of the tribe) Platypleura; the species name is from the Korean: 꼬마: kkoma or ggoma meaning little child.
