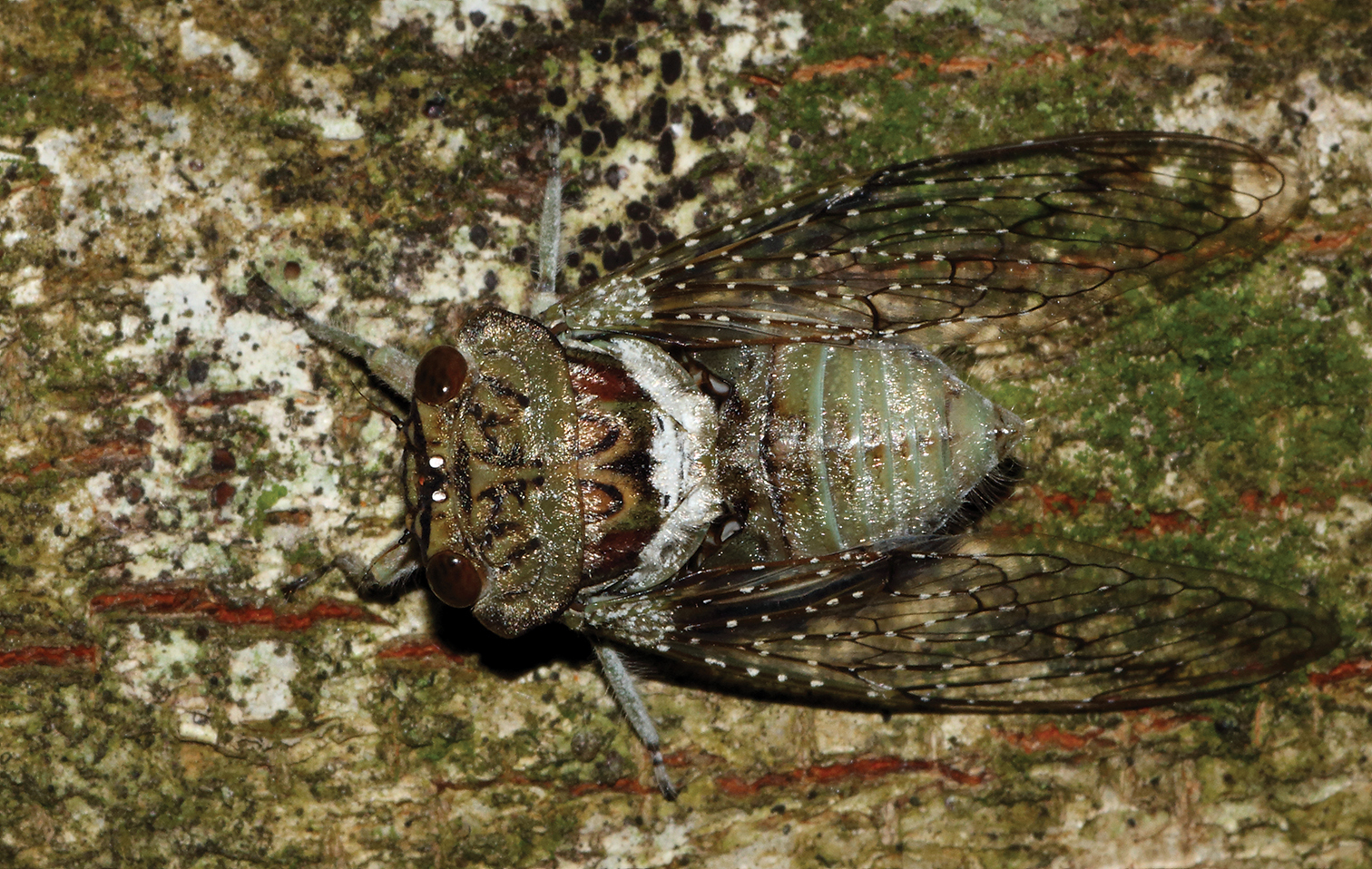

Scientific classification
- Kingdom: Animalia
- Phylum: Arthropoda
- Class: Insecta
- Order: Hemiptera
- Suborder: Auchenorrhyncha
- Family: Cicadidae
- Subfamily: Cicadinae
- Tribe: Platypleurini
- Genus: Brevisiana
- Species: B. brevis

Binomial name
- Brevisiana brevis (Walker, 1850)

= Brevisiana brevis =

Species of true bug

Brevisana brevis, known as the shrill thorntree cicada, is a cicada found in Africa and is likely the loudest insect on record. It has been recorded producing sounds with pressure levels of 106.7 decibels at a distance of 50 cm.

Brevisana brevis is found in the African countries Angola, Zimbabwe, South Africa, and Malawi.
