= Neoplatypleura =

Scientific classification
- Domain: Eukaryota
- Kingdom: Animalia
- Phylum: Arthropoda
- Class: Insecta
- Order: Hemiptera
- Suborder: Auchenorrhyncha
- Family: Cicadidae
- Subfamily: Cicadinae
- Tribe: Platypleurini
- Genus: Neoplatypleura; Kato, 1926

Synonyms
- Platypleura (Neoplatypleura) Kato, 1926

Genus of cicadas

External image
- Images at iNaturalist

Neoplatypleura is a genus of Asian cicadas in the tribe Platypleurini, erected by Masayo Kato in 1926, but long placed as a subgenus until being restored in 2024. The name is derived from the Greek: νέος (new) and the similar (type genus of the tribe) Platypleura; species distribution records include: India, China, Indochina and Malesia.

== Species ==
The World Auchenorrhyncha Database includes:

1. Neoplatypleura badia (Distant, 1888)
2. Neoplatypleura insignis (Distant, 1879)
3. Neoplatypleura nobilis (Germar, 1830) - type species (as Cicada nobilis Germar, 1830) - Thailand
4. Neoplatypleura vitreolimbata (Breddin, 1905)
