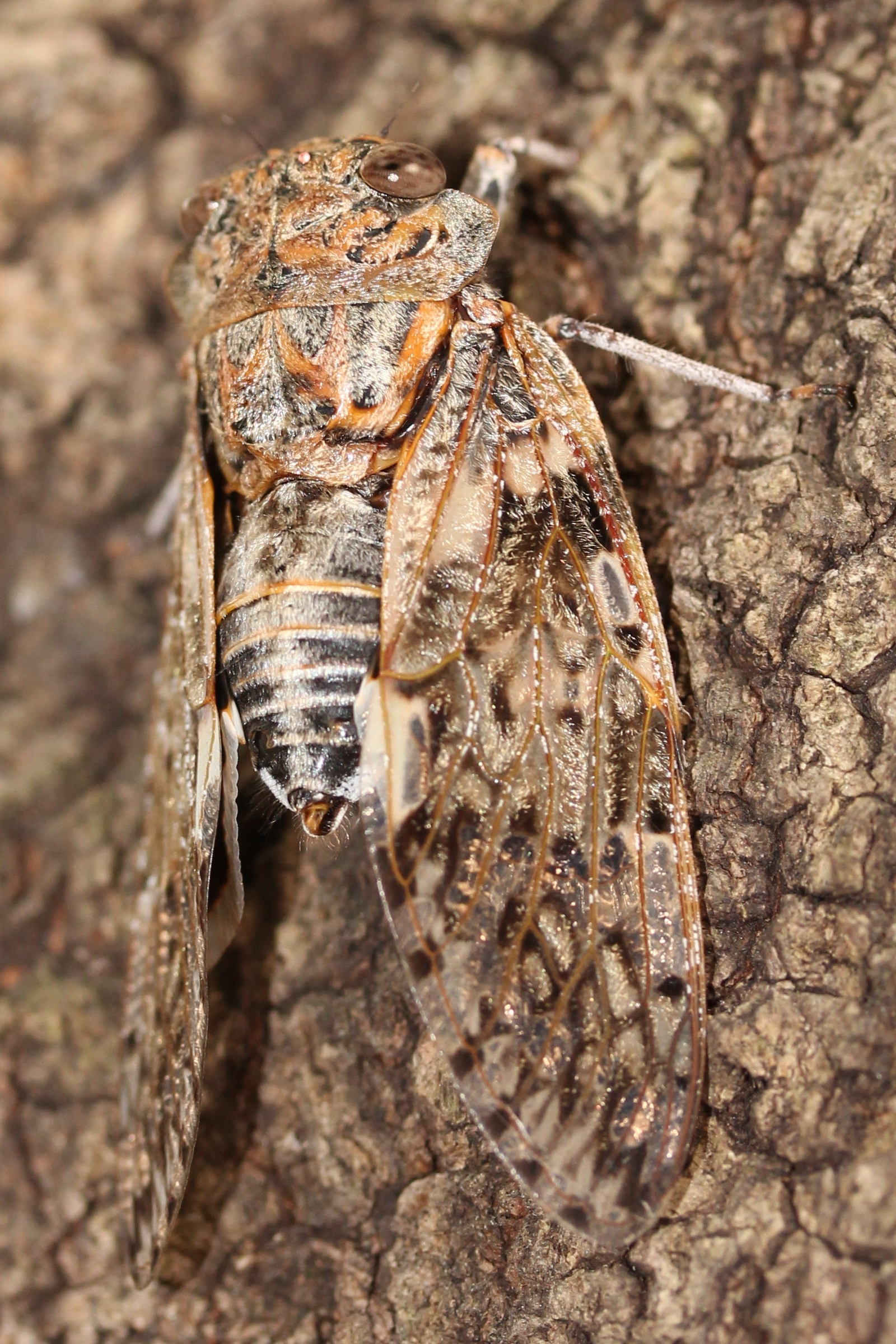
- Planopleura kaempferi

Scientific classification
- Domain: Eukaryota
- Kingdom: Animalia
- Phylum: Arthropoda
- Class: Insecta
- Order: Hemiptera
- Suborder: Auchenorrhyncha
- Family: Cicadidae
- Subfamily: Cicadinae
- Tribe: Platypleurini
- Genus: Planopleura; Lee, 2024

= Planopleura =

Genus of cicadas

Planopleura is a genus of Asian cicadas in the tribe Platypleurini, erected by Young June Lee in 2024. He named it from the Latin 'plano-' meaning flat and the similar (type genus of the tribe) Platypleura, where several species were placed previously. Species distribution records include: India, China, Korea, Japan, Indochina, Malesia through to New Guinea.

== Species ==
The World Auchenorrhyncha Database includes:

1. Planopleura albivannata (Hayashi, 1974) – Japan
2. Planopleura assamensis (Atkinson, 1884)
3. Planopleura dinagatensis (Lee, 2016)
4. Planopleura elizabethae (Lee, 2009)
5. Planopleura fuscangulis (Butler, 1874)
6. Planopleura kaempferi_{(ja)} (Fabricius, 1794) – Japan, China, Taiwan, Vietnam, Malaysia, Russia, Korean Peninsula – type species by original designation of Planopleura
7. Planopleura kuroiwae (Matsumura, 1917) – Japan
8. Planopleura miyakona (Matsumura, 1917) – Japan
9. Planopleura ridleyana (Distant, 1905) - Vietnam, western Malesia
10. Planopleura takasagona (Matsumura, 1917)
11. Planopleura transitiva (Lee, 2021) - Philippines
12. Planopleura yayeyamana (Matsumura, 1917) – Japan
