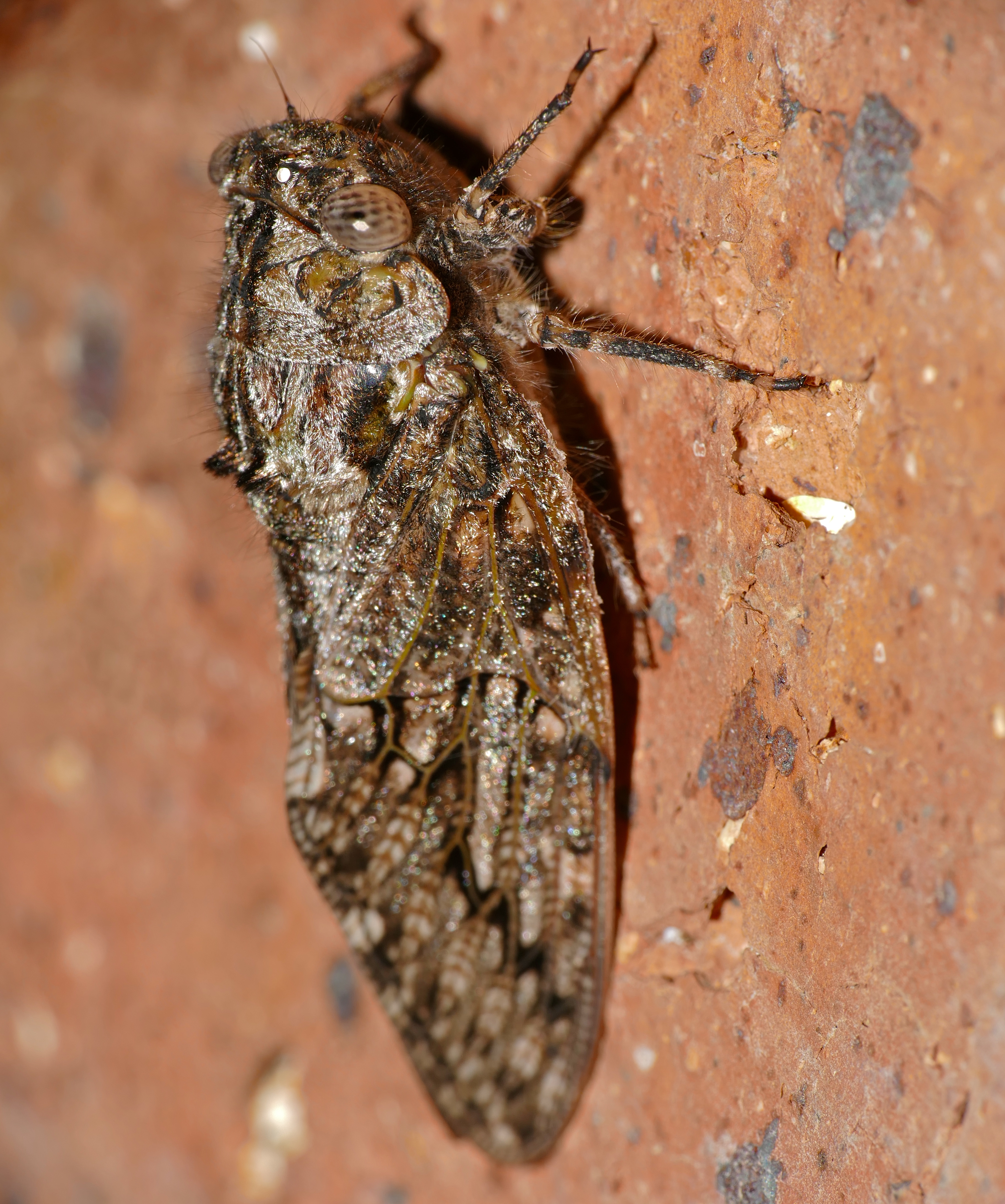

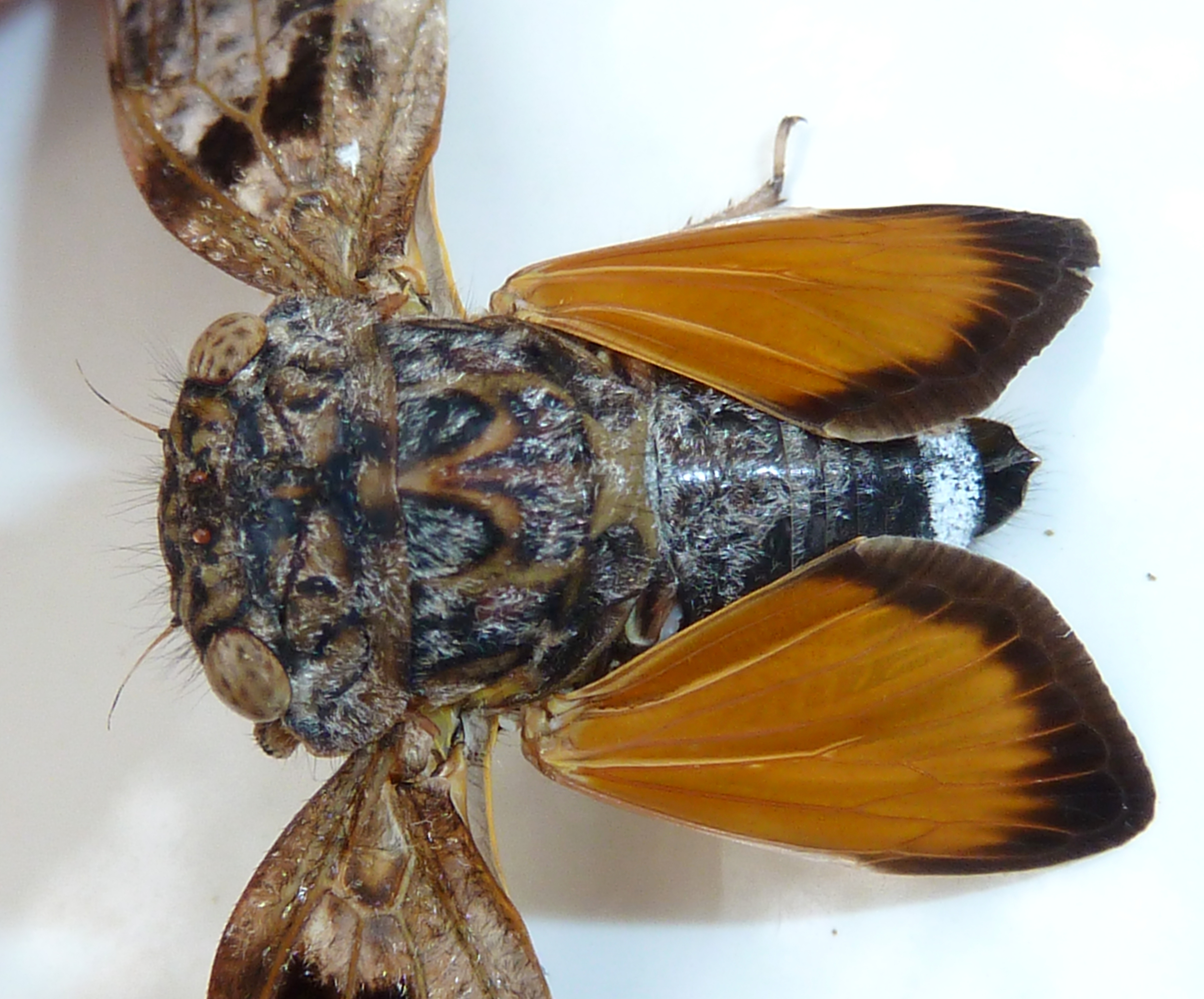
- Adults in South Africa, with closed and opened wings

Scientific classification
- Kingdom: Animalia
- Phylum: Arthropoda
- Clade: Pancrustacea
- Class: Insecta
- Order: Hemiptera
- Suborder: Auchenorrhyncha
- Family: Cicadidae
- Genus: Platypleura
- Species: P. haglundi

Binomial name
- Platypleura haglundi Stål, 1866

= Platypleura haglundi =

Species of true bug

Platypleura haglundi is a medium-sized African cicada species, that occurs from northern South Africa to Zimbabwe, where it is found in diverse habitats. In South Africa it has been recorded in North West, the northern Free State, Northern Province, Gauteng, Mpumalanga and Kwazulu-Natal. The type was collected in Weenen Game Reserve, KwaZulu-Natal.

It has deep ochre hind-wings like its congeners, with a complete black border. The abdomen is black with an incomplete terminal white band. The species feeds on Acacia, Dichrostachys cinerea and Delonix regia. The adults are active from October to March. As with other southern African cicadas, they would generally emerge later at more southerly latitudes, and usually after seasonal rains.

It forms part of a southern African radiation in the Platypleura that started during the Miocene. A larger species of the southern African radiation, P. capensis, replaces it in the Cape fynbos regions.
