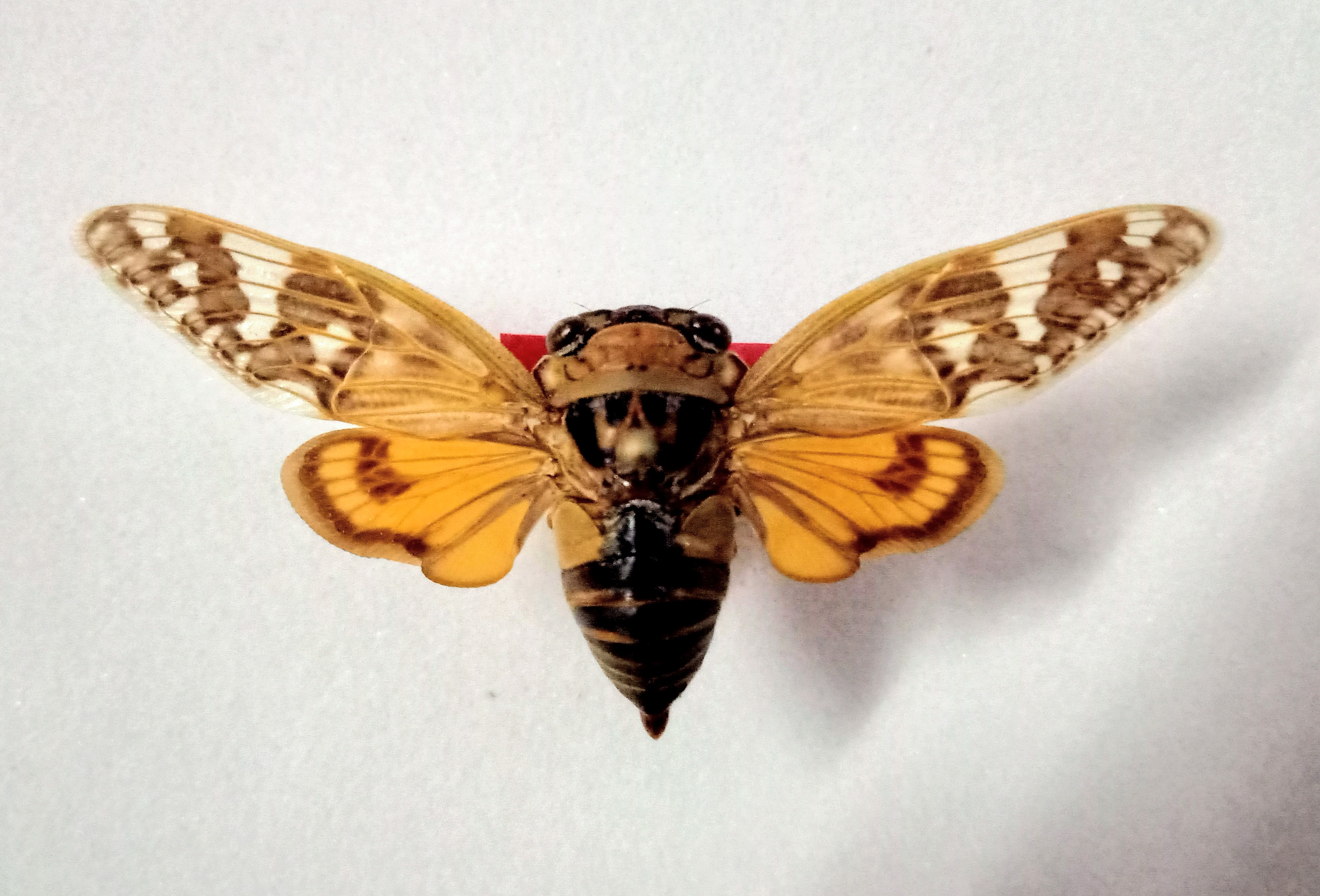

Scientific classification
- Domain: Eukaryota
- Kingdom: Animalia
- Phylum: Arthropoda
- Class: Insecta
- Order: Hemiptera
- Suborder: Auchenorrhyncha
- Family: Cicadidae
- Genus: Platypleura
- Species: P. poorvachala

Binomial name
- Platypleura poorvachala Marathe, Yeshwanth, Basu & Kunte, 2017

= Platypleura poorvachala =

Species of true bug

Platypleura poorvachala is a species of cicada described from the Eastern Ghats of Peninsular India. It was described in 2017 on the basis of specimens obtained in scrub forest near Nagalapuram in Chittoor District.
