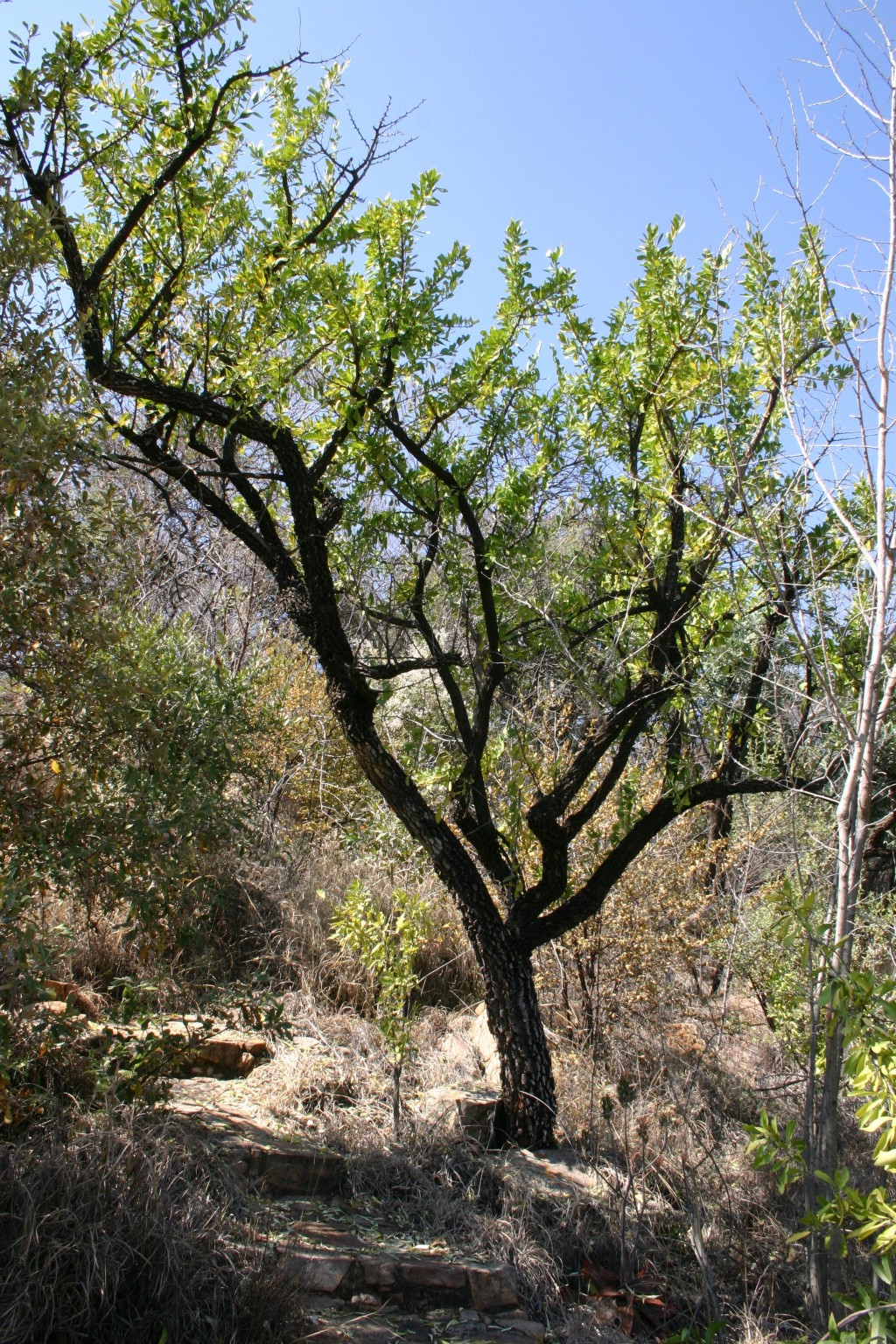

Scientific classification
- Kingdom: Plantae
- Clade: Tracheophytes
- Clade: Angiosperms
- Clade: Eudicots
- Clade: Rosids
- Order: Celastrales
- Family: Celastraceae
- Genus: Gymnosporia
- Species: G. heterophylla

Binomial name
- Gymnosporia heterophylla (Eckl. & Zeyh.) Loes

Synonyms
- Maytenus heterophylla (Eckl. & Zeyh.) Robson; Gymonosporia buxifolia

= Gymnosporia heterophylla =

Species of tree

Gymnosporia heterophylla, the common spike-thorn, is a small, hardy, deciduous African tree up to 5 m tall, occurring in rocky places with a wide distribution from Ethiopia, the Sudan and the Congo, south to the Cape Province and west to Angola and Namibia, as well as the neighbouring islands of Madagascar and Saint Helena, with a closely related species from Mauritius.

It has a straggly, but rigid habit and is armed with sharp straight thorns up to 100mm long, which are modified branches. Bark on the mature trunk is grey-brown and deeply fissured. The tree is dioecious, and clusters of white flowers are produced in profusion in spring and are borne on thicker twigs and branches. The flowers have a fetid, faecal smell and attract large numbers of pollinating insects, particularly carrion-loving flies such as members of the family Calliphoridae. The tree has a close relationship with a number of cicada species, such as Platypleura divisa, P. mijburghi and P. maytenophila.

The specific name "heterophylla" means "variable leaves" and if the list of past synonyms is examined, it affords an interesting insight into the minds of botanists since 1753 when Linnaeus decided that the leaves reminded him of boxwood and named it Celastrus buxifolius. Since then it has been named ellipticus, heterophyllus, spathephyllus, empleurifolius, rhombifolius, parvifolius and buxifolioides - it would seem that the epithet heterophylla is appropriate.

It makes a very effective, fast-growing security hedge. The wood is hard and durable, suitable for carving, though large pieces are not often available.

== Pictures ==
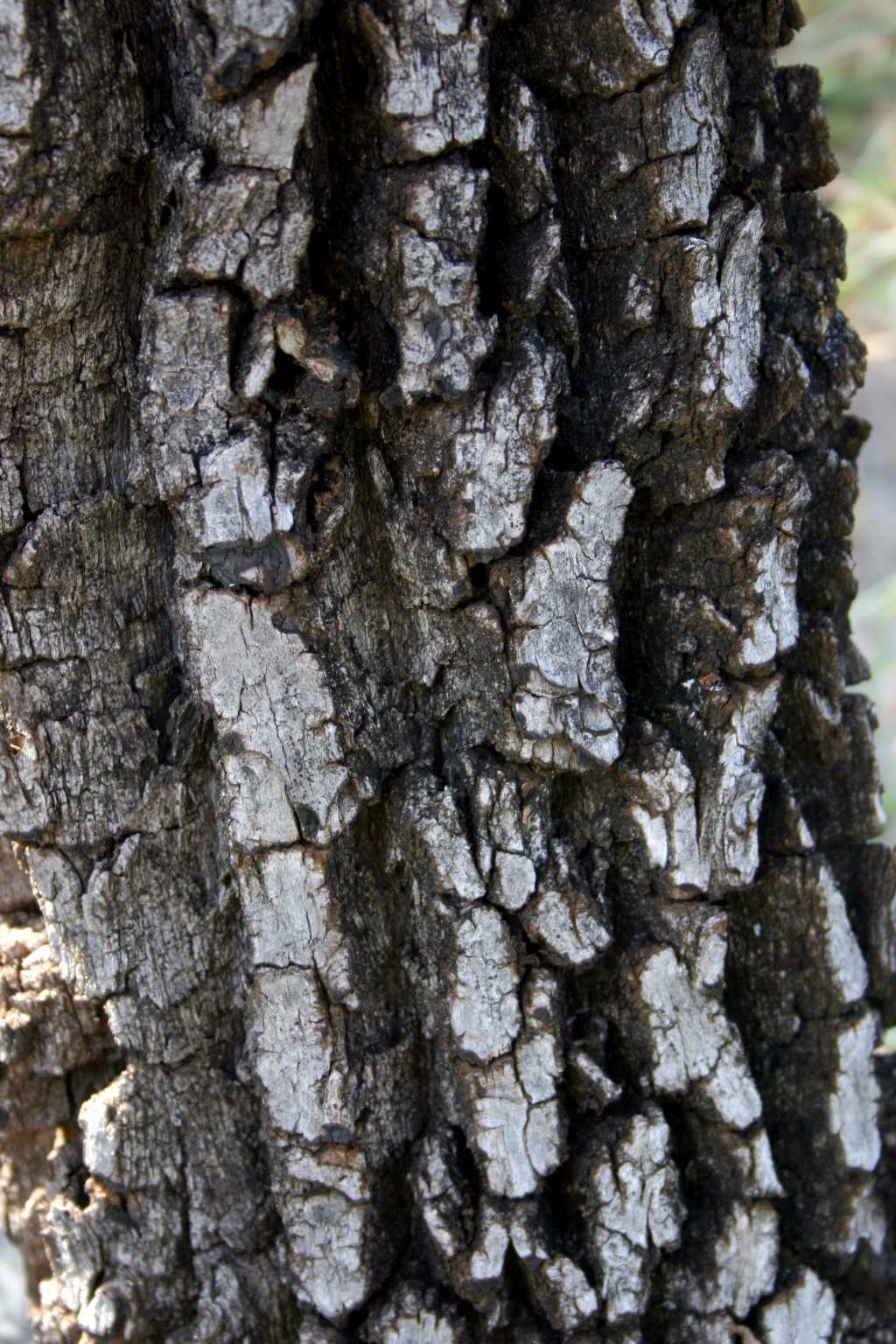

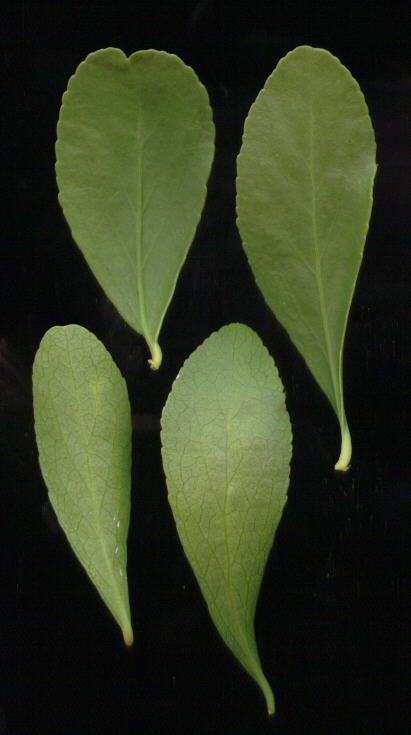

== Sources ==
- Trees and Shrubs of the Witwatersrand - Tree Society (Witwatersrand University Press, 1969)
- Trees and Shrubs of Mpumalanga and Kruger National Park - Schmidt et al. (Jacana Press, 2002)
