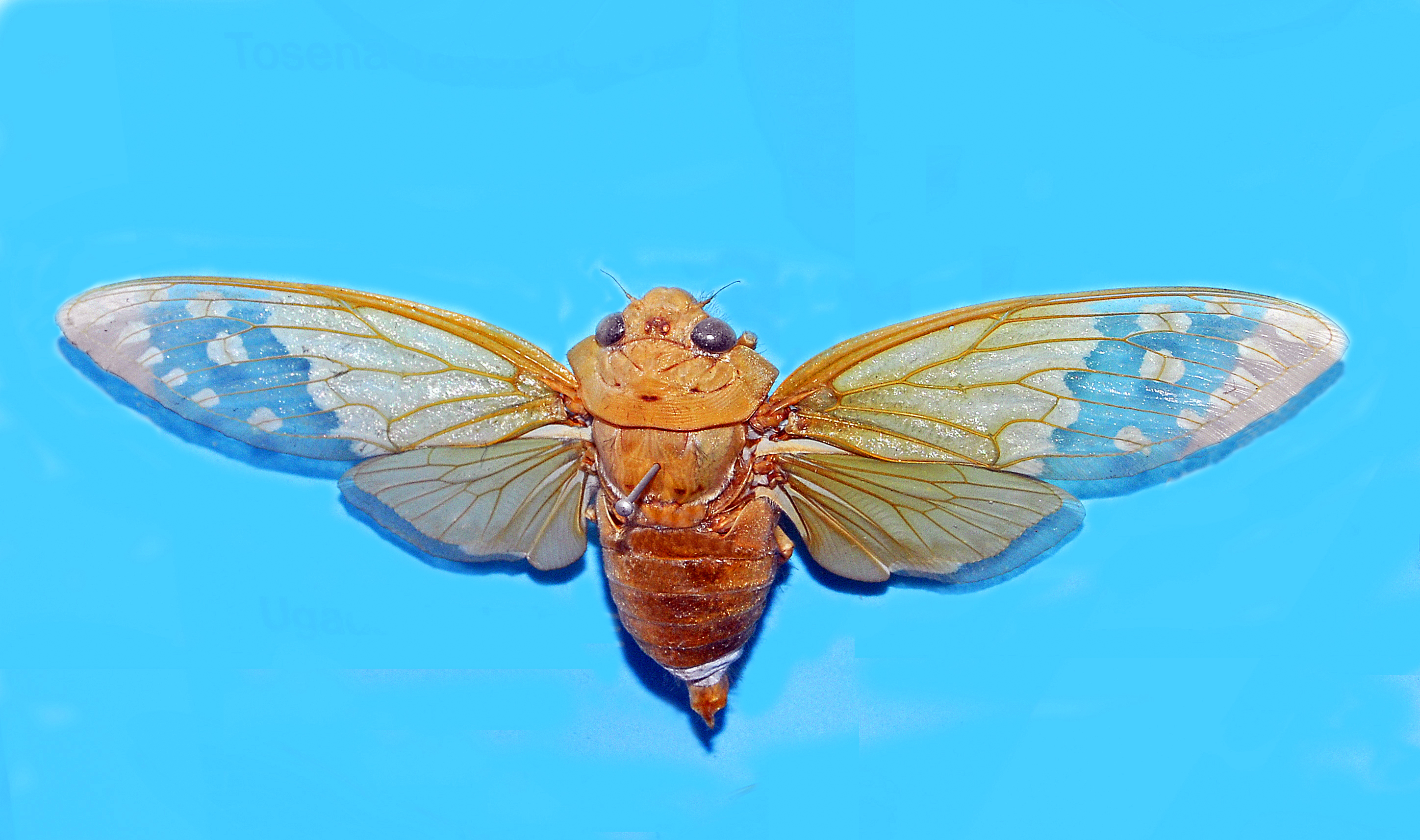

Scientific classification
- Kingdom: Animalia
- Phylum: Arthropoda
- Clade: Pancrustacea
- Class: Insecta
- Order: Hemiptera
- Suborder: Auchenorrhyncha
- Family: Cicadidae
- Genus: Ugada
- Species: U. limbata

Binomial name
- Ugada limbata (Fabricius, 1775)

= Ugada limbata =

Genus of insects

Ugada limbata is a species of cicadas belonging to the family Cicadidae.

== Distribution ==
This species is present in West Africa (Ivory Coast, Nigeria, Gabon, Burkina Faso, Central African Republic, Cameroon, Congo, Democratic Republic of Congo, Zambia).
