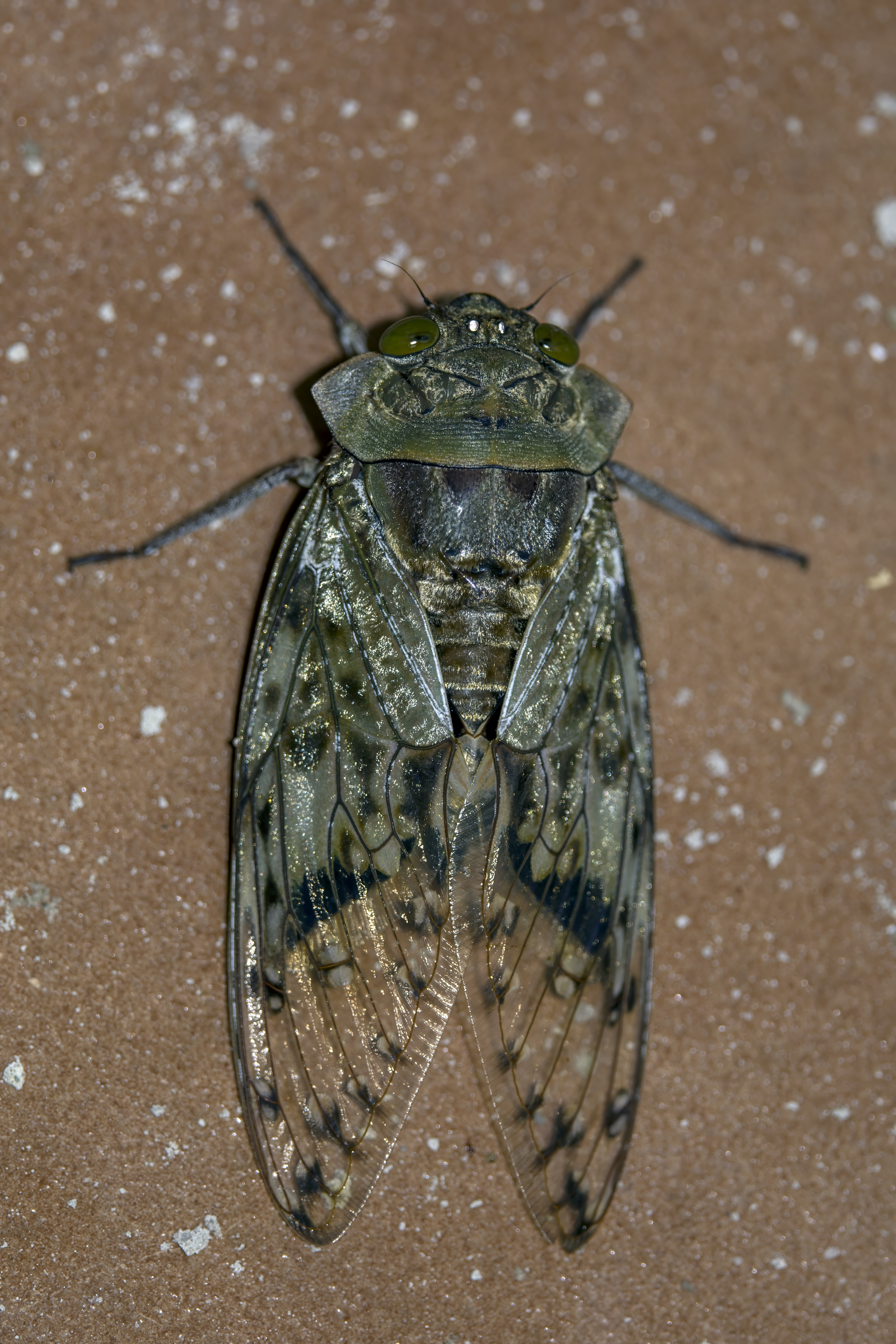
- Ugada sp., Ghana

Scientific classification
- Kingdom: Animalia
- Phylum: Arthropoda
- Clade: Pancrustacea
- Class: Insecta
- Order: Hemiptera
- Suborder: Auchenorrhyncha
- Family: Cicadidae
- Subfamily: Cicadinae
- Tribe: Platypleurini
- Genus: Ugada; Distant, 1904

Species
- See text

= Ugada =

Genus of insects

Ugada is a genus of cicadas from Africa.

== List of species ==
- Ugada grandicollis (Germar, 1830)
- Ugada inquinata (Distant, 1881)
- Ugada limbalis (Karsch, 1890)
- Ugada limbata (Fabricius, 1775)
- Ugada limbimacula (Karsch, 1893)
- Ugada nutti Distant, 1904
- Ugada praecellens (Stål, 1863)
- Ugada stalina (Butler, 1874)
- Ugada tigrina (Palisot de Beauvois, 1805)
