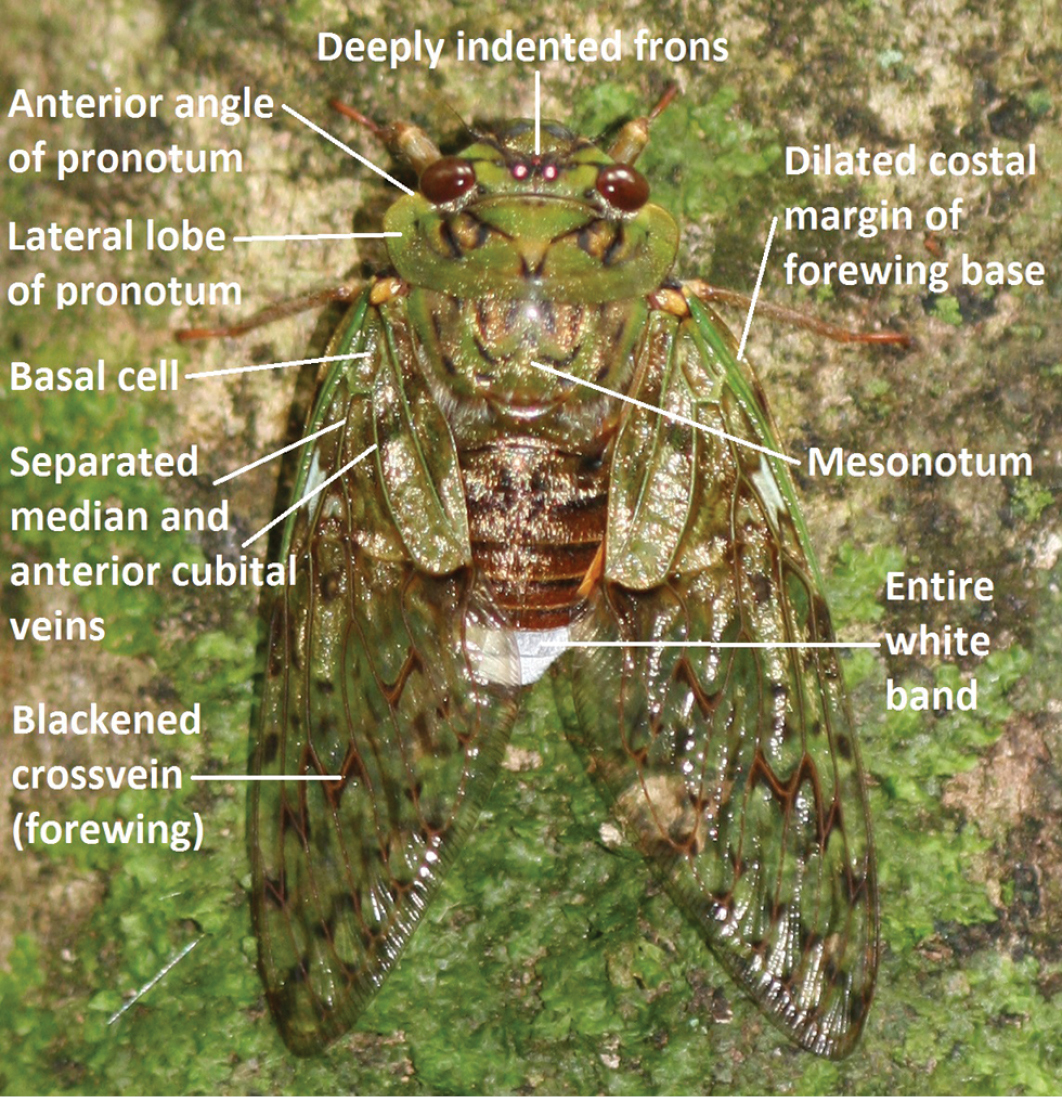
- Dyticopycna semiclara showing features

Scientific classification
- Domain: Eukaryota
- Kingdom: Animalia
- Phylum: Arthropoda
- Class: Insecta
- Order: Hemiptera
- Suborder: Auchenorrhyncha
- Family: Cicadidae
- Subfamily: Cicadinae
- Tribe: Platypleurini
- Genus: Dyticopycna; Sanborn, 2020

Synonyms
- Pycnoides Sanborn, 2020

= Dyticopycna =

Genus of cicadas

Dyticopycna is a genus of mainland African cicadas in the tribe Platypleurini, erected by Allen Sanborn in 2020; he named it from the Greek: δυτικός (western) and the similar genus Pycna (now only containing species from Madagascar), where several species were placed before the revision. At least four species have also been moved here from Platypleura.

Species distribution records are from Sub-Saharan Africa: especially the West and South of the continent.

== Species ==
The World Auchenorrhyncha Database includes:

1. Dyticopycna antinorii (Lethierry, 1881)
2. Dyticopycna baxteri (Distant, 1914)
3. Dyticopycna beccarii (Lethierry, 1881)
4. Dyticopycna dolosa (Boulard, 1975)
5. Dyticopycna hecuba (Distant, 1904)
6. Dyticopycna moniquae (Boulard, 2012)
7. Dyticopycna natalensis (Distant, 1905)
8. Dyticopycna neavei (Distant, 1912)
9. Dyticopycna passosdecarvalhoi (Boulard, 1975)
10. Dyticopycna quanza (Distant, 1899)
11. Dyticopycna semiclara (Germar, 1834) – type species (as Cicada semiclara Germar and original designation of Dyticopycna Sanborn)
12. Dyticopycna sylvia (Distant, 1899)
13. Dyticopycna umbelinae (Boulard, 1975)
14. Dyticopycna vitrea (Schumacher, 1913)
15. Dyticopycna vitticollis (Jacobi, 1904)
16. Dyticopycna zambiaensis (Sanborn, 2020)
