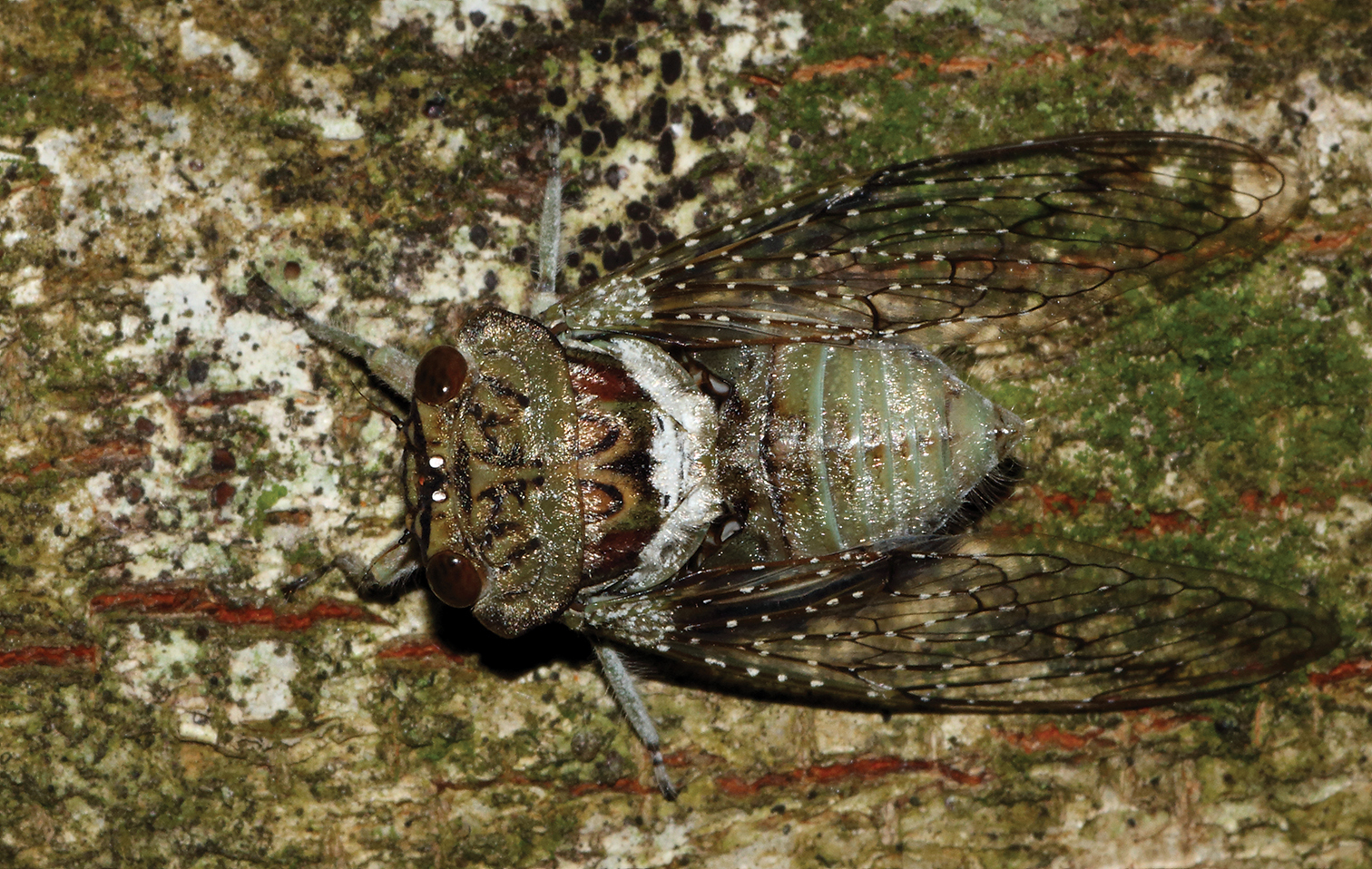
- Male Brevisiana brevis

Scientific classification
- Domain: Eukaryota
- Kingdom: Animalia
- Phylum: Arthropoda
- Class: Insecta
- Order: Hemiptera
- Suborder: Auchenorrhyncha
- Family: Cicadidae
- Subfamily: Cicadinae
- Tribe: Platypleurini
- Genus: Brevisiana; Boulard, 1973

= Brevisiana =

Genus of insects

Brevisiana is a genus of cicadas in the family Cicadidae. There are at least three described species in Brevisiana, found in southern Africa.

== Species ==
These three species belong to the genus Brevisiana:

- Brevisiana brevis (Walker, 1850) (Shrill Thorntree Cicada) (Angola, Zimbabwe, South Africa, and Malawi)
- Brevisiana niveonotata (Butler, 1874) (Kenya)
- Brevisiana quartaui Boulard, 1972 (Angola)
