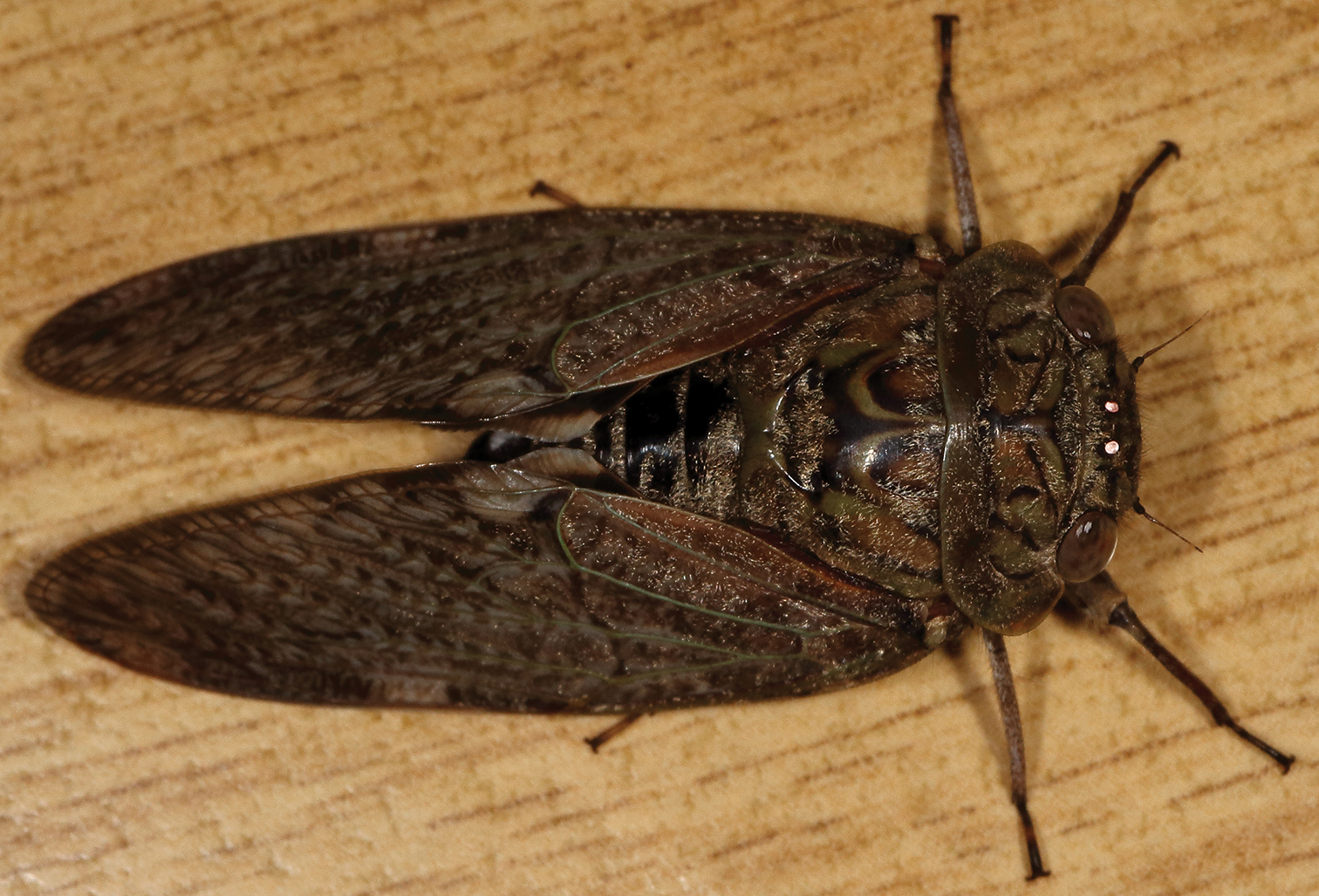
- Platypleura deusta

Scientific classification
- Kingdom: Animalia
- Phylum: Arthropoda
- Clade: Pancrustacea
- Class: Insecta
- Order: Hemiptera
- Suborder: Auchenorrhyncha
- Family: Cicadidae
- Tribe: Platypleurini
- Genus: Platypleura; Amyot & Serville, 1843

Species
- See text.

= Platypleura =

Genus of true bugs

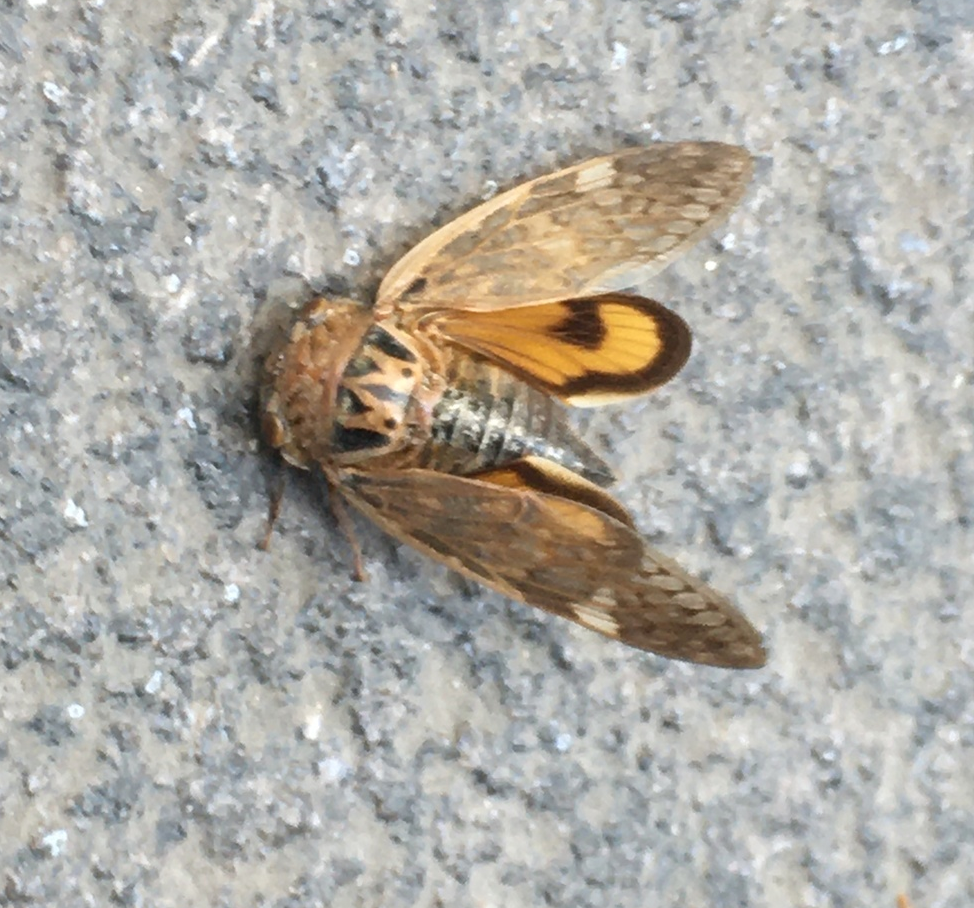
Platypleura hilpa

Platypleura is a genus of cicadas, occurring widely across Africa and southern Asia; it is the type genus of the tribe Platypleurini and species previously included here are now placed in other similar genera, such as Planopleura and Dyticopycna.

Some of the South African species are remarkable for their endothermic thermoregulation that enables crepuscular signalling, an adaptation that reduces risk of predation and enables a greater range for their calls. In field experiments their maximum body temperature while calling at dusk, was measured at 22 °C above ambient temperature.

The Platypleurini are distributed from the Cape in South Africa, throughout sub-Saharan Africa and Madagascar, through India and south-eastern Asia, to Japan. The faunas of West Africa and Madagascar are distinctive, while those of southern and east Africa resemble the Asian group. Endothermy occurs in several large-bodied South American and South African species, but not in related small-bodied species.

== Species ==
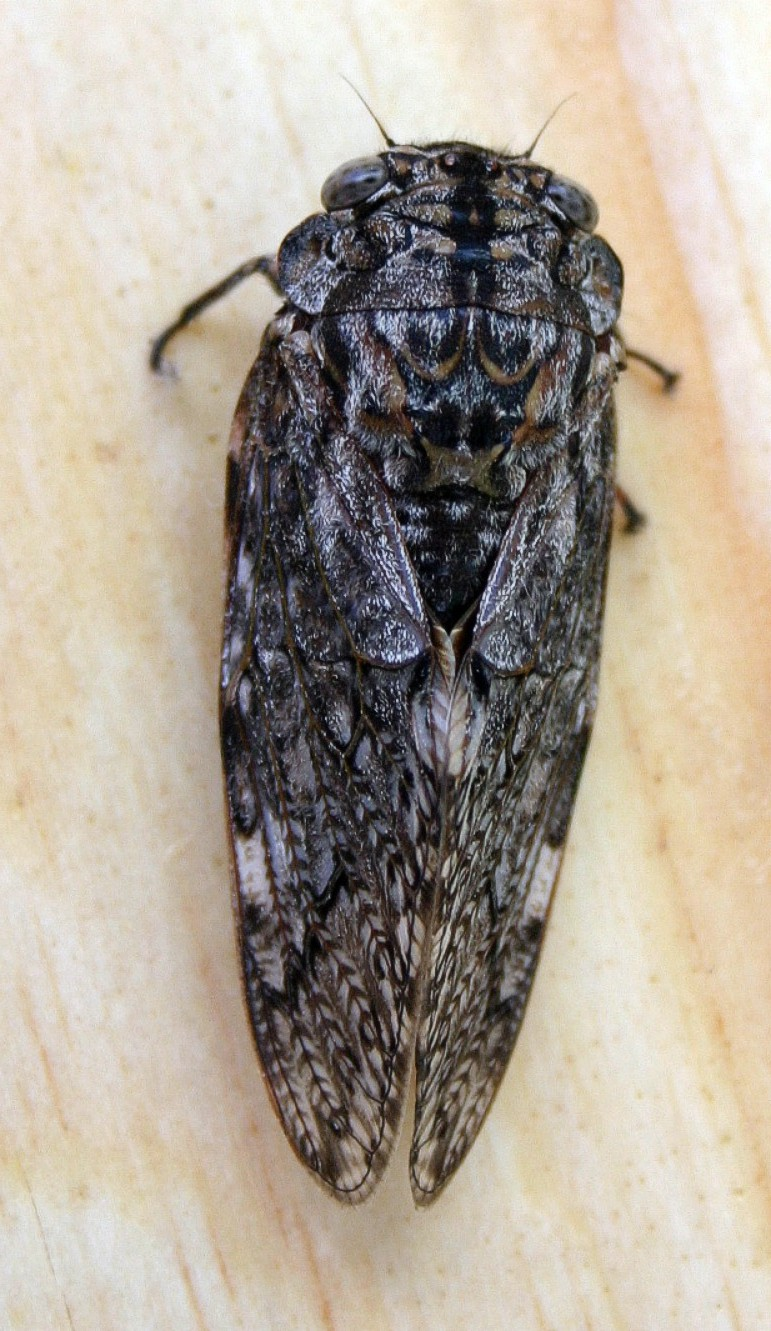
Platypleura mijburghi

The World Auchenorrhyncha Database includes:

1. Platypleura adouma Distant, 1904
2. Platypleura affinis (Fabricius, 1803)
3. Platypleura andamana Distant, 1878 – Andaman Islands
4. Platypleura arabica Myers, 1928 – United Arab Emirates
5. Platypleura argentata Villet, 1987 – Kwazulu-Natal, South Africa
6. Platypleura argus Melichar, 1911
7. Platypleura arminops (Noualhier, 1896) – Thailand
8. Platypleura assamensis Atkinson, 1884 – Jalpaiguri
9. Platypleura auropilosa Kato, 1940 – Thailand
10. Platypleura basimacula Walker, 1850 – Kwazulu-Natal, Mpumalanga, Limpopo, Northwest Province, Free State, Mozambique, Zimbabwe
11. Platypleura basi-viridis Walker, 1850 – India
12. Platypleura bettoni Distant, 1904
13. Platypleura bombifrons Karsch, 1890 – Mpumalanga, Limpopo, Zimbabwe
14. Platypleura brevis Walker, 1850 – Kwazulu-Natal, Mpumalanga, Limpopo, Botswana, Zimbabwe, Malawi
15. Platypleura brunea Villet, 1989a – Eastern Cape, South Africa
16. Platypleura canescens Walker, 1870 – East Timor
17. Platypleura capensis (Linnaeus, 1764) – Western Cape and Eastern Cape, South Africa on Metalasia muricata, Brachylaena discolor
18. Platypleura capitata (Olivier, 1790)
19. Platypleura cespiticola Boulard, 2006
20. Platypleura centralis Distant, 1897
21. Platypleura chalybaea Villet, 1989a – Eastern Cape, South Africa on Euphorbia triangularis
22. Platypleura ciliaris (Linnaeus, 1758)
23. Platypleura clara Amyot & Serville, 1843
24. Platypleura coelebs Stål, 1863
25. Platypleura crampeli Boulard, 1975
26. Platypleura deusta (Thunberg, 1822) – Mpumalanga, Kwazulu-Natal and Lesotho, South Africa on Leucosidea sericea, Cliffortia
27. Platypleura distincta Atkinson, 1884
28. Platypleura divisa (Germar, 1834) – Gauteng, Mpumalanga, Kwazulu-Natal and Eastern Cape, South Africa on Maytenus heterophylla
29. Platypleura durvillei (Boulard, 1991)
30. Platypleura fulvigera Walker, 1850
31. Platypleura girardi Boulard, 1977
32. Platypleura gowdeyi Distant, 1914 – South Africa on Vachellia gerrardi
33. Platypleura haglundi Stål, 1866 – Northwest Province, Free State, Limpopo, Gauteng, Mpumalanga and Kwazulu-Natal, to Zimbabwe, Southern Africa on Acacia karroo, Acacia, Dichrostachys cinerea
34. Platypleura hampsoni (Distant, 1887)
35. Platypleura harmandi Distant, 1905
36. Platypleura hilpa (Walker, 1850)
37. Platypleura hirta Karsch, 1890 – Limpopo, Gauteng and Mpumalanga
38. Platypleura hirtipennis (Germar, 1834) – Eastern Cape, South Africa on Acacia karroo
39. Platypleura inglisi Ollenbach, 1928
40. Platypleura instabilis Boulard, 1977
41. Platypleura intermedia Liu, 1940
42. Platypleura kabindana Distant, 1919
43. Platypleura kenyana Lallemand, 1929
44. Platypleura laticlavia Stål, 1858 – Northwest Province, Limpopo, Northern Cape, Botswana, Namibia
45. Platypleura lindiana Distant, 1905
46. Platypleura lineatella Distant, 1905
47. Platypleura longirostris Ashton, 1914
48. Platypleura lourensi Lee, 2009
49. Platypleura machadoi Boulard, 1972
50. Platypleura mackinnoni Distant, 1904
51. Platypleura makaga Distant, 1904
52. Platypleura maytenophila Villet, 1987 – Kwazulu-Natal, South Africa on Maytenus heterophylla
53. Platypleura mijburghi Villet, 1989a – Gauteng, Mpumalanga and Limpopo, South Africa on Maytenus heterophylla
54. Platypleura minima Lee & Marshall, 2023
55. Platypleura mira (Distant, 1904) – Thailand
56. Platypleura murchisoni Distant, 1905e – Mpumalanga
57. Platypleura nigrosignata Distant, 1913
58. Platypleura octoguttata (Fabricius, 1798)
59. Platypleura parvula Boulard, 2006
60. Platypleura pinheyi Boulard, 1980
61. Platypleura plumosa (Germar, 1834) – Eastern Cape, South Africa on Acacia karroo
62. Platypleura polita (Walker, 1850)
63. Platypleura polydorus (Walker, 1850)
64. Platypleura poorvachala Marathe, Yeshwanth, Basu & Kunte, 2017
65. Platypleura punctigera Walker, 1850 – Kwazulu-Natal, Eastern Cape
66. Platypleura rothschildi Melichar, 1911
67. Platypleura semusta (Distant, 1887)
68. Platypleura signifera Walker, 1850 – Eastern Cape
69. Platypleura sobrina Stål, 1866
70. Platypleura stridula (Linnaeus, 1758) - type species (as Cicada stridula Linnaeus) – Western Cape, South Africa on Salix
71. Platypleura takasagona_{zh} Matsumura, 1917 – Taiwan
72. Platypleura techowi Schumacher, 1913 – Northern Cape, Free State, North West Province, Limpopo and Mpumalanga
73. Platypleura testacea (Walker, 1858)
74. Platypleura turneri Boulard, 1975 – Western Cape
75. Platypleura wahlbergi Stål, 1855 – Eastern Cape and Kwazulu-Natal, South Africa on Acacia karroo
76. Platypleura watsoni (Distant, 1897) – Thailand
77. Platypleura westwoodi Stål, 1863
78. Platypleura witteana Dlabola, 1960

Note:

- P. quadraticollis (Mpumalanga, Limpopo, Botswana, Zimbabwe) is now Oxypleura quadraticollis (Butler, 1874)
- P. zuluensis (Eastern Cape, Western Cape, Kwazulu-Natal) is now Azanicada zuluensis (Villet, 1987)
