= Oxypleura calypso =

Scientific classification
- Kingdom: Animalia
- Phylum: Arthropoda
- Clade: Pancrustacea
- Class: Insecta
- Order: Hemiptera
- Suborder: Auchenorrhyncha
- Family: Cicadidae
- Genus: Oxypleura
- Species: O. calypso

Binomial name
- Oxypleura calypso Kirby, 1889

Species of cicada

Oxypleura calypso, also known as the Christmas Island cicada, is a species of cicada in the true cicada family. It is endemic to Christmas Island, an Australian external territory in the Indian Ocean. It was described in 1889 by English entomologist William Forsell Kirby.

== Description ==
The length of the forewing is 33–38 mm.

== Distribution and habitat ==
The species is known only from Christmas Island, where its habitat is tropical rainforest.

== Behaviour ==
Adults have been heard from August to April, clinging to the trunks of the trees, uttering loud, rich, modulated calls.
