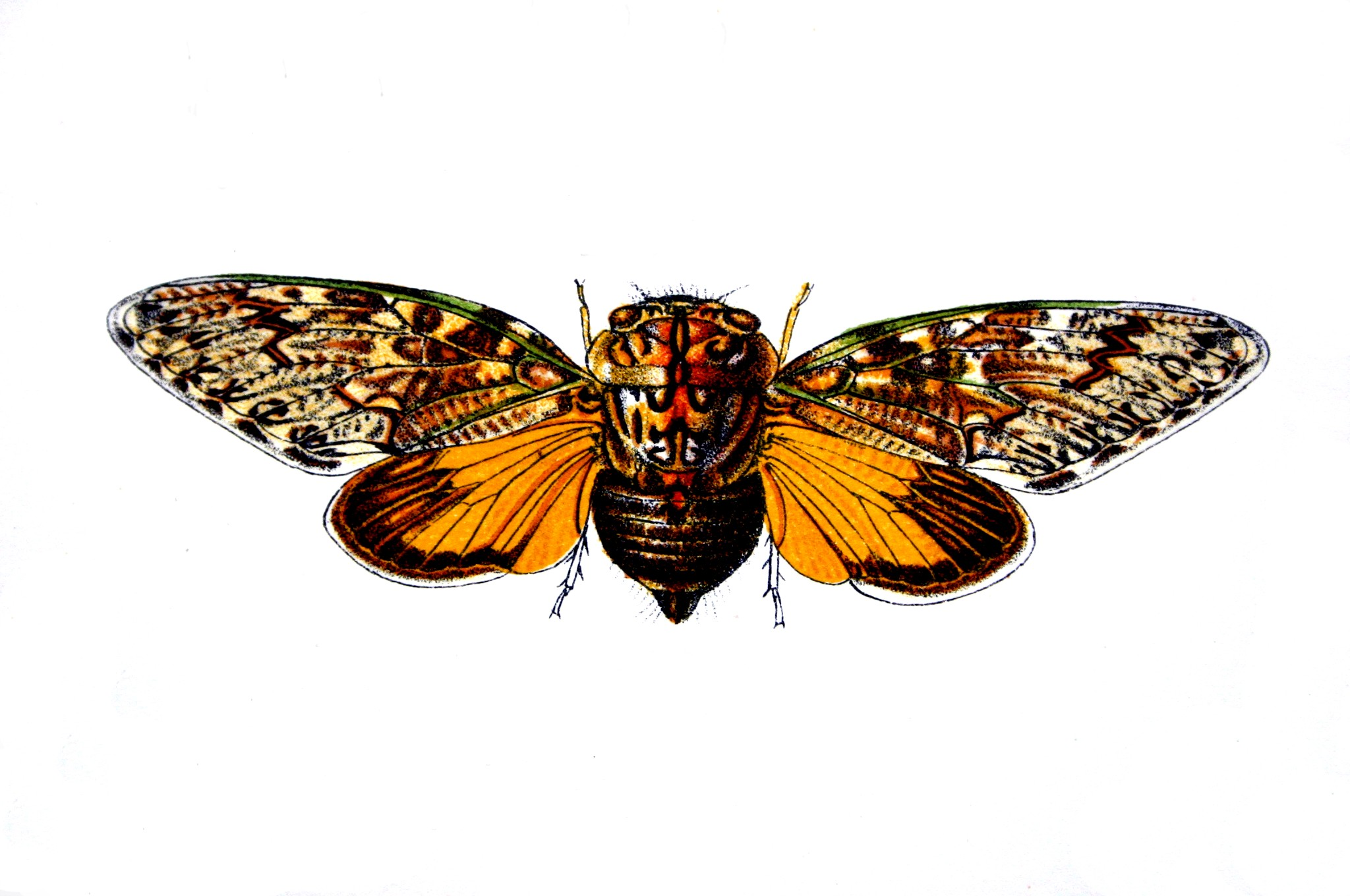

Scientific classification
- Kingdom: Animalia
- Phylum: Arthropoda
- Clade: Pancrustacea
- Class: Insecta
- Order: Hemiptera
- Suborder: Auchenorrhyncha
- Family: Cicadidae
- Genus: Platypleura
- Species: P. divisa

Binomial name
- Platypleura divisa (Germar, 1834)

= Platypleura divisa =

Species of true bug

Platypleura divisa is an African cicada first described by Ernst Friedrich Germar, entomologist and professor of mineralogy at Halle, who also studied beetles.

The genus Platypleura occurs widely across Africa and southern Asia. Some of the South African species are remarkable for their endothermic thermoregulation that enables crepuscular signalling, an adaptation that reduces risk of predation and enables a greater range for their calls. In field experiments their maximum body temperature while calling at dusk, was measured at 22 °C above ambient temperature.

Platypleura divisa is even more noteworthy in that it has been collected only from one species of foodplant, the small tree Maytenus heterophylla. The closely related coastal species P. maytenophila shares its strong bond with Maytenus heterophylla, but is distinguishable by a quite different call.

The Platypleurini are distributed from the Cape in South Africa, throughout sub-Saharan Africa and Madagascar, through India and south East Asia, to Japan. The faunas of West Africa and Madagascar are distinctive, while those of southern and east Africa resemble the Asian group. Endothermy occurs in several large-bodied South American and South African species, but not in related small-bodied species.
