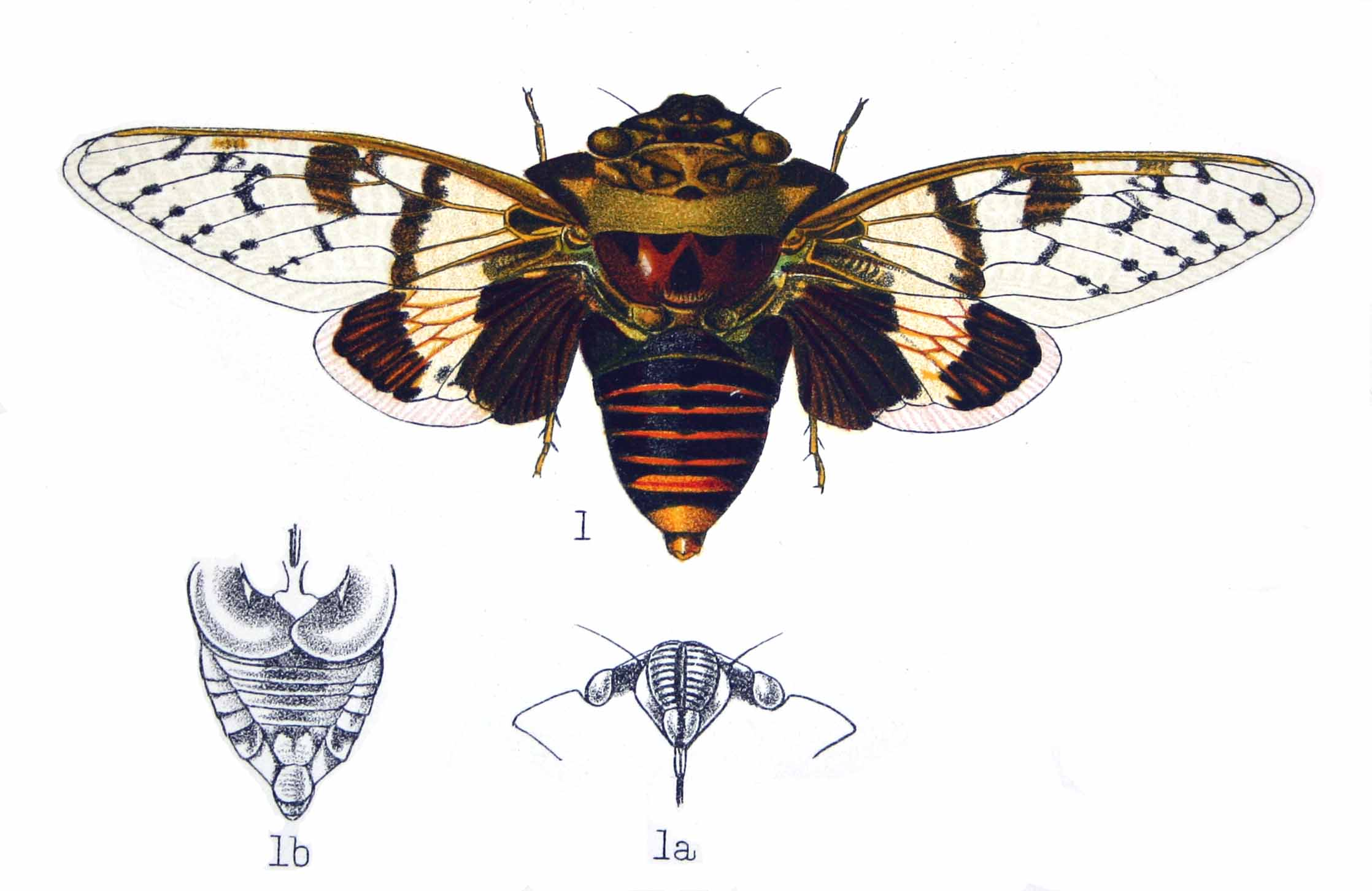
- Ioba leopardina from "Insecta transvaaliensia" by Distant

Scientific classification
- Kingdom: Animalia
- Phylum: Arthropoda
- Class: Insecta
- Order: Hemiptera
- Suborder: Auchenorrhyncha
- Family: Cicadidae
- Genus: Ioba
- Species: I. leopardina

Binomial name
- Ioba leopardina (Distant, 1881)

= Ioba leopardina =

Species of true bug

Ioba leopardina (Distant, 1881) is an African species of Cicada. They are 4–5 cm (1.6–2.0 in) long, including the wings, and with mottled grey cryptic colouration.

According to Distant this species is found almost throughout the Ethiopian region, but apparently it is absent in Madagascar. He first published its description under the name Poecilopsaltria leopardina in "Transactions of the Entomological Society of London" in 1881. It occurs in the former Transvaal Province of South Africa in the Lydenburg district, in Mashonaland near Gadzima, in Nyasaland at Zomba and Fort Johnston and throughout East Africa.

The male insects produce a monotonous call of piercing shrillness with the introductory notes having a distinctive throbbing sound. The females respond by clicking, produced by a flicking of the wings. Distant notes that Guy Marshall collected specimens from the Machabel tree (Brachystegia boehmii Taub).

In the vicinity of Victoria Falls the species is closely associated with mopane trees, feeding on the roots and emerging after the first rains. They normally call from branches near the middle of the tree, well camouflaged against predators when settled on the rough bark. The communal sound starts during the heat of day, rises to a peak at dusk and may carry on for several hours after sunset; this calling in concert produces a deafening noise.

The Marula tree is also favoured for its sap. Cicadas squirt a constant stream of processed sap from the tips of their abdomens, deftly directing the jet away from the tree.
