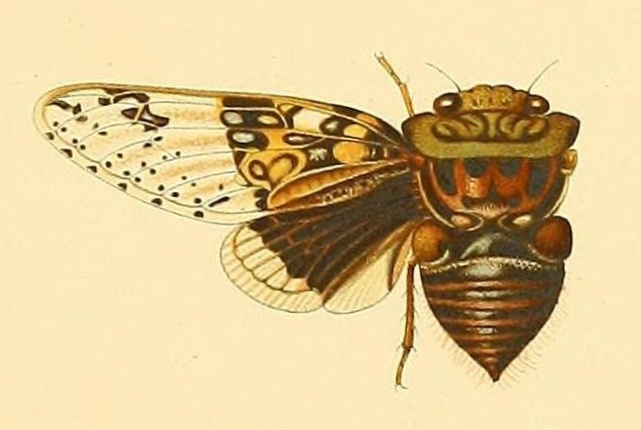
- Eopycna coelestia

Scientific classification
- Domain: Eukaryota
- Kingdom: Animalia
- Phylum: Arthropoda
- Class: Insecta
- Order: Hemiptera
- Suborder: Auchenorrhyncha
- Family: Cicadidae
- Subfamily: Cicadinae
- Tribe: Platypleurini
- Genus: Eopycna; Sanborn, 2020

= Eopycna =

Genus of cicadas

Eopycna is a genus of Asian cicadas in the tribe Platypleurini, erected by Allen Sanborn in 2020; he named it from the Greek: ἠώς (early, dawn) and the similar genus Pycna, where several species were placed before the revision.

Species distribution records include: Pakistan, northern India, Himalayas, Sri Lanka, China, Taiwan, Japan, Indochina, Malesia (not the Philippines) through to New Guinea.

== Species ==
The World Auchenorrhyncha Database includes:

1. Eopycna coelestia (Distant, 1904)
2. Eopycna concinna (Boulard, 2005)
3. Eopycna himalayana (Naruse, 1977)
4. Eopycna indochinensis (Distant, 1913)
5. Eopycna minor (Liu, 1940)
6. Eopycna montana (Hayashi, 1978)
7. Eopycna repanda (Linnaeus, 1758) - type species (as Cicada repanda Linnaeus)
8. Eopycna verna (Hayashi, 1982)
