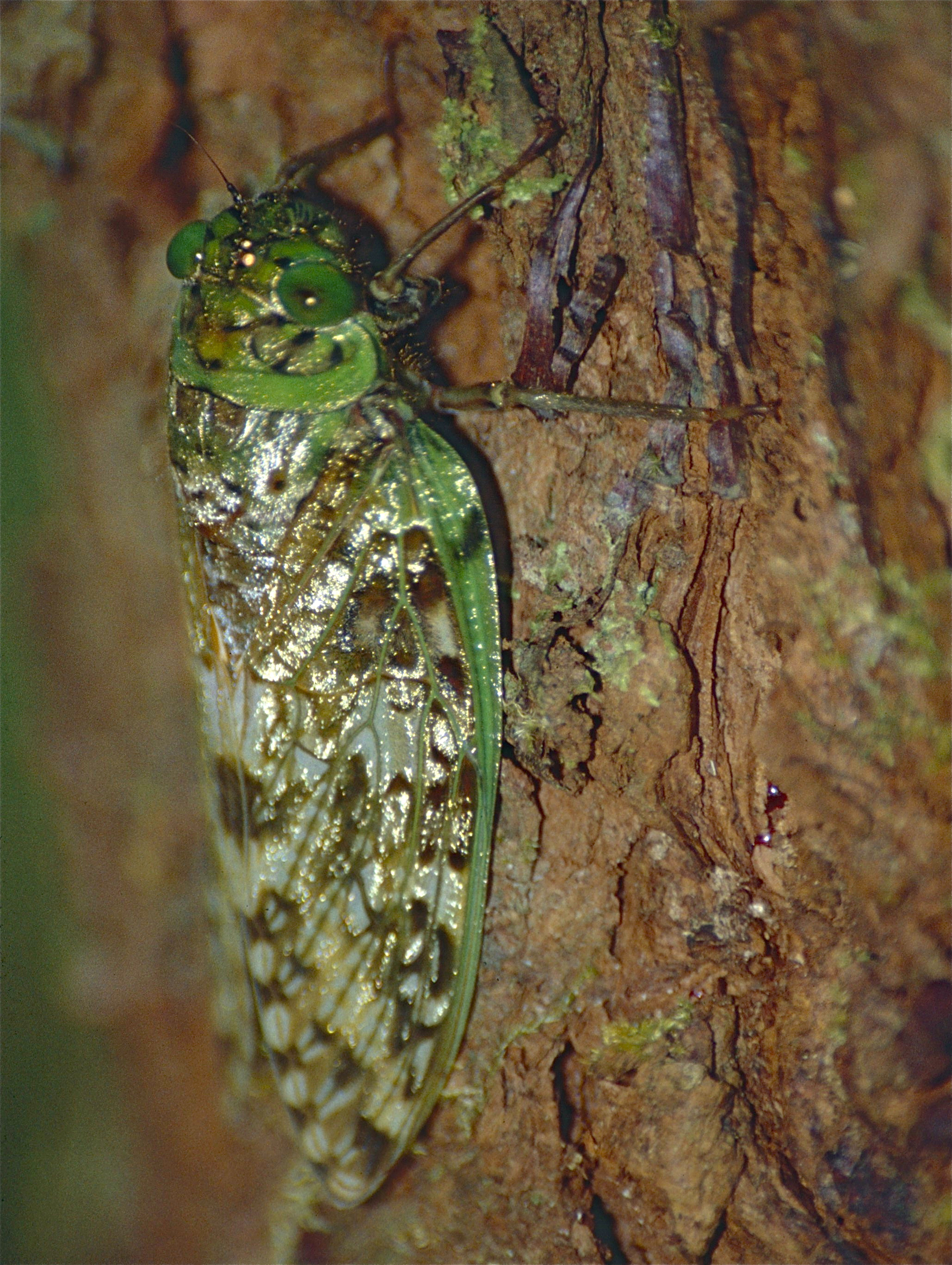
- Yanga andriana

Scientific classification
- Kingdom: Animalia
- Phylum: Arthropoda
- Clade: Pancrustacea
- Class: Insecta
- Order: Hemiptera
- Suborder: Auchenorrhyncha
- Family: Cicadidae
- Subfamily: Cicadinae
- Tribe: Platypleurini
- Genus: Yanga; Distant, 1904

= Yanga (cicada) =

Genus of true bugs

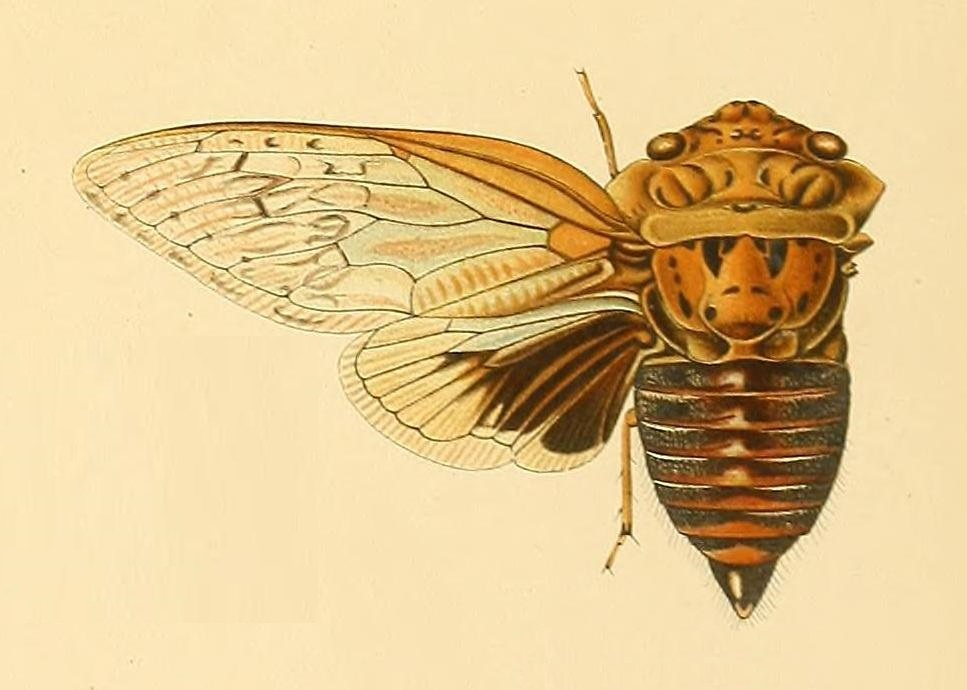
Yanga brancsiki, female

Yanga is a genus of cicadas from Madagascar, Nosy Be, Comoros, Mayotte, and Pemba Island. There are about 15 described species in Yanga.

== Species ==
These 15 species belong to the genus Yanga:

- Yanga andriana (Distant, 1899) (Madagascar)
- Yanga antiopa (Karsch, 1890) (Madagascar)
- Yanga argyrea (Melichar, 1896) (Madagascar)
- Yanga bouvieri Distant, 1905 (Madagascar)
- Yanga brancsiki (Distant, 1893) (Madagascar)
- Yanga grandidieri Distant, 1905 (Madagascar)
- Yanga guttulata (Signoret, 1860) (Madagascar)
- Yanga heathi (Distant, 1899) (Madagascar)
- Yanga hova (Distant, 1901) (Madagascar)
- Yanga johanae Boulard, 2022
- Yanga mahajangaensis Sanborn, 2021 (Madagascar)
- Yanga mayottensis Boulard, 1990 (Mayotte)
- Yanga pembana (Distant, 1899)
- Yanga pulverea (Distant, 1882) (Madagascar)
- Yanga viettei Boulard, 1981 (Comoros)
