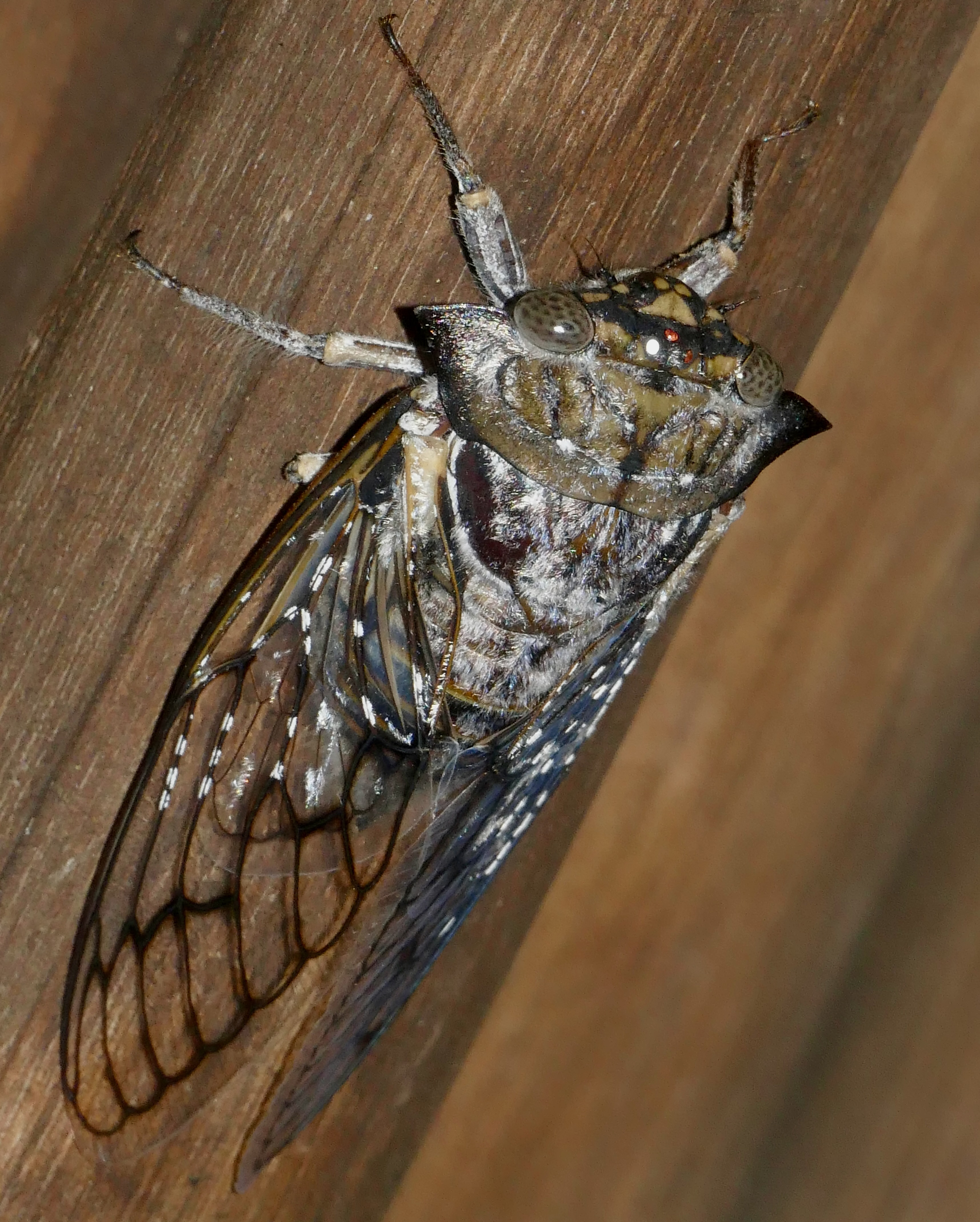
- Oxypleura quadraticollis

Scientific classification
- Kingdom: Animalia
- Phylum: Arthropoda
- Class: Insecta
- Order: Hemiptera
- Suborder: Auchenorrhyncha
- Family: Cicadidae
- Subfamily: Cicadinae
- Tribe: Platypleurini
- Genus: Oxypleura; Amyot & Audinet-Serville, 1843

Synonyms
- Oxyplelure Amyot & Audinet-Serville, 1843

= Oxypleura =

Genus of cicadas

Oxypleura is a genus of Asian cicadas in the tribe Platypleurini, erected by Charles Jean-Baptiste Amyot and Jean Guillaume Audinet-Serville in 1843; they named it from the Greek: οξύς (sharp) and pleura (πλευρά). Species distribution records include: Africa, the Arabian Peninsula, India, Indochina and Australia.

== Species ==
The World Auchenorrhyncha Database includes:

1. Oxypleura atkinsoni (Distant, 1912)
2. Oxypleura basalis Signoret, 1891
3. Oxypleura calypso Kirby, 1889 - Christmas Island Cicada
4. Oxypleura centralis (Distant, 1897)
5. Oxypleura clara Amyot & Audinet-Serville, 1843 - type species
6. Oxypleura ethiopiensis Boulard, 1975
7. Oxypleura lenihani Boulard, 1985
8. Oxypleura pointeli Boulard, 1985
9. Oxypleura quadraticollis (Butler, 1874)
10. Oxypleura spoerryae Boulard, 1980
