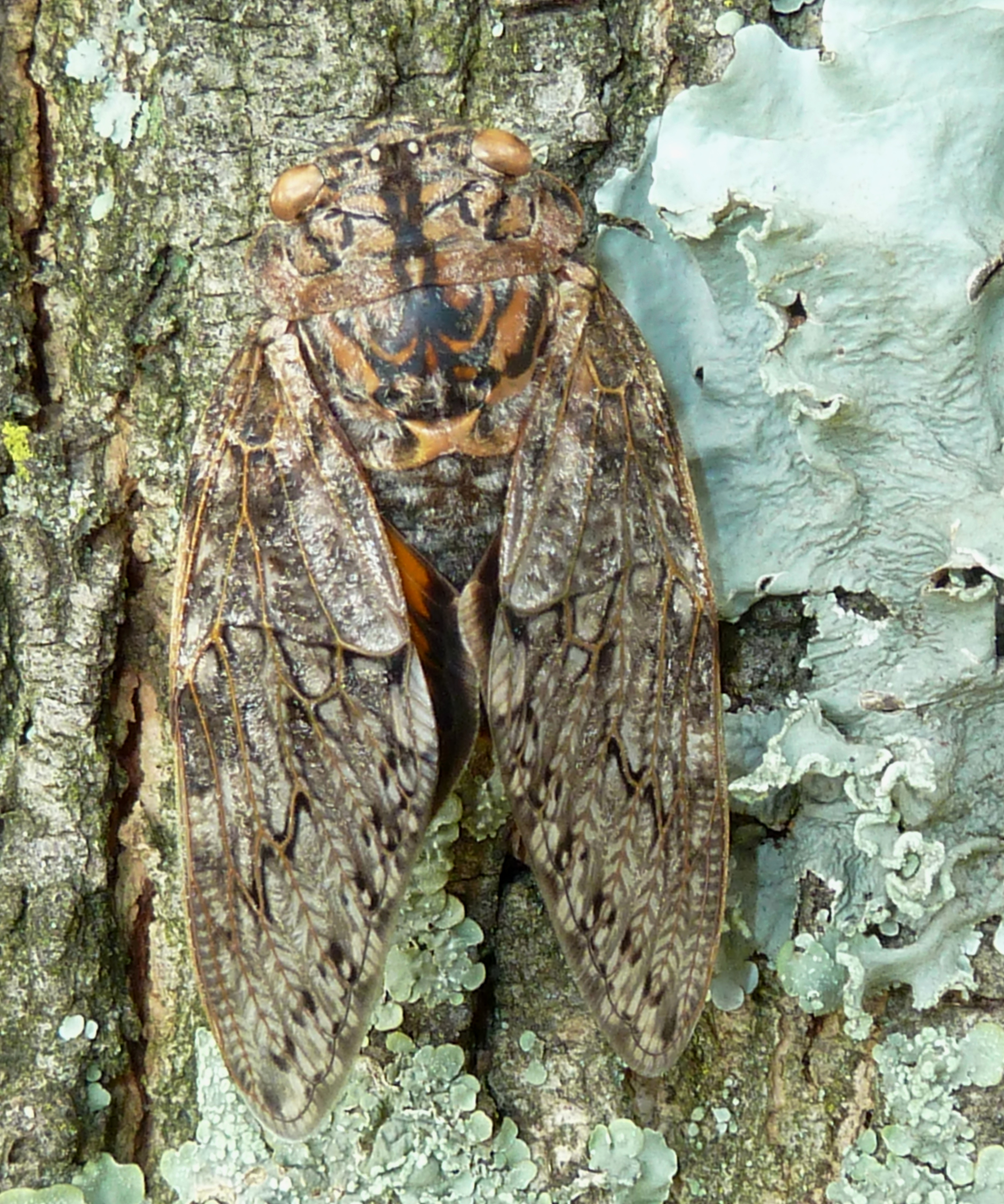
- Adult in the Magaliesberg, South Africa

Scientific classification
- Kingdom: Animalia
- Phylum: Arthropoda
- Clade: Pancrustacea
- Class: Insecta
- Order: Hemiptera
- Suborder: Auchenorrhyncha
- Family: Cicadidae
- Genus: Platypleura
- Species: P. mijburghi

Binomial name
- Platypleura mijburghi Villet, 1989

= Platypleura mijburghi =

Species of true bug

Platypleura mijburghi is a medium-sized cicada species, that is native to South Africa. It has been recorded in Gauteng, Mpumalanga and the Limpopo Province. The adults are active from October to January.
