= Maurice Noualhier =

French entomologist

Martial Jean Maurice Noualhier (1 September 1860, La Borie, Haute-Vienne – 7 April 1898, Arcachon) was a French entomologist who specialised in Hemiptera.

He was the son of Martial Noualhier and Anaïs née Pougeard du Limbert. Maurice Noualhier made collecting expeditions to Switzerland, to Morocco and to Algeria. He moved to the Canary Islands for his health and named a number of new species there. He purchased the Hemiptera and Coleoptera collection of Lucien François Lethierry (1830–1894). These specimens along with his own were left to the Muséum national d'histoire naturelle and his library to the Société entomologique de France of which he was a member.

== Species ==
Noualhier named over fifty species in his short life, at least twenty-nine of which continue to be valid, including:

- Acrorrhinium conspersum (Noualhier, 1895)
- Anisops debilis canariensis (Noualhier, 1893) (aquatic backswimmer bug)
- Cixius verticalis (Noualhier, 1897)
- Cosmoscarta septempunctata (Noualhier & Martin, 1904)
- Cosmoscarta dimidiata (Noualhier, 1896)
- Cyphopterum fauveli (Noualhier, 1897)
- Eudolycoris alluaudi (Noualhier, 1893)
- Hemisphaerius interclusus (Noualhier, 1896)
- Laternaria monetaria (Noualhier, 1896)
- Oecleus cucullatus (Noualhier, 1896)
- Oecleopsis petasatus (Noualhier, 1896)
- Ploiaria putoni (Noualhier, 1895)
- Ricanoides flabellum (Noualhier, 1896)
- Stusakia picticornis (Noualhier, 1898)

== Selected works ==
- 1893. Voyage de M. Ch. Alluaud aux iles Canaries (Novembre 1889 - Juin 1890). 2e Memoire. Hémiptères Gymnocerates & Hydrocorises. Annales de la Société Entomologique de France 52:5–18.
- 1896. Note sur les Hémiptères récoltés en Indo-Chine et offerts au Muséum par M. Pavie. Bull. Mus. Paris 1896:251–259.
- 1897. Hémiptères recueillis par M. A. Fauvel en Madère, en Mai et Juin 1896. Revue d'Entomologie Publiée par la Société Française d'Entomologie 16:76–80.
- 1898. Hémiptères Gymnocérates récoltés au Sénégal par M. Chevreux (Campagne de la Goélette Melita en 1889–1890), avec la description des espéces nouvelles. Bulletin du Muséum d'Histoire Naturelle 1898(5):232–23
