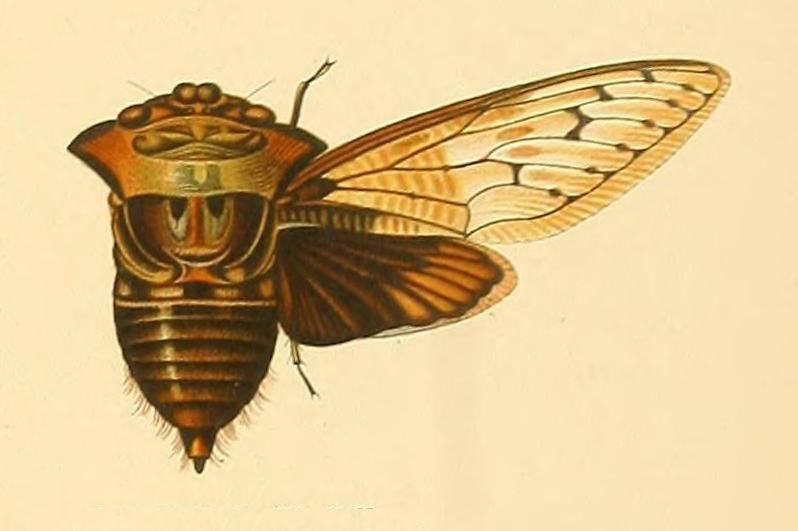
- Ioba limbaticollis

Scientific classification
- Kingdom: Animalia
- Phylum: Arthropoda
- Clade: Pancrustacea
- Class: Insecta
- Order: Hemiptera
- Suborder: Auchenorrhyncha
- Family: Cicadidae
- Genus: Ioba; Distant, 1904

= Ioba (cicada) =

Genus of true bugs

Ioba is a genus of cicadas with an afrotropical distribution.

== Species ==
These six species belong to the genus Ioba:

- Ioba bequaerti Distant, 1913^{c g}
- Ioba horizontalis (Karsch, 1890)^{c g}
- Ioba leopardina (Distant, 1881)^{c g}
- Ioba limbaticollis (Stal, 1863)^{c g}
- Ioba stormsi (Distant, 1893)^{c g}
- Ioba veligera (Jacobi, 1904)^{c g}

Data sources: i = ITIS, c = Catalogue of Life, g = GBIF, b = Bugguide.net
