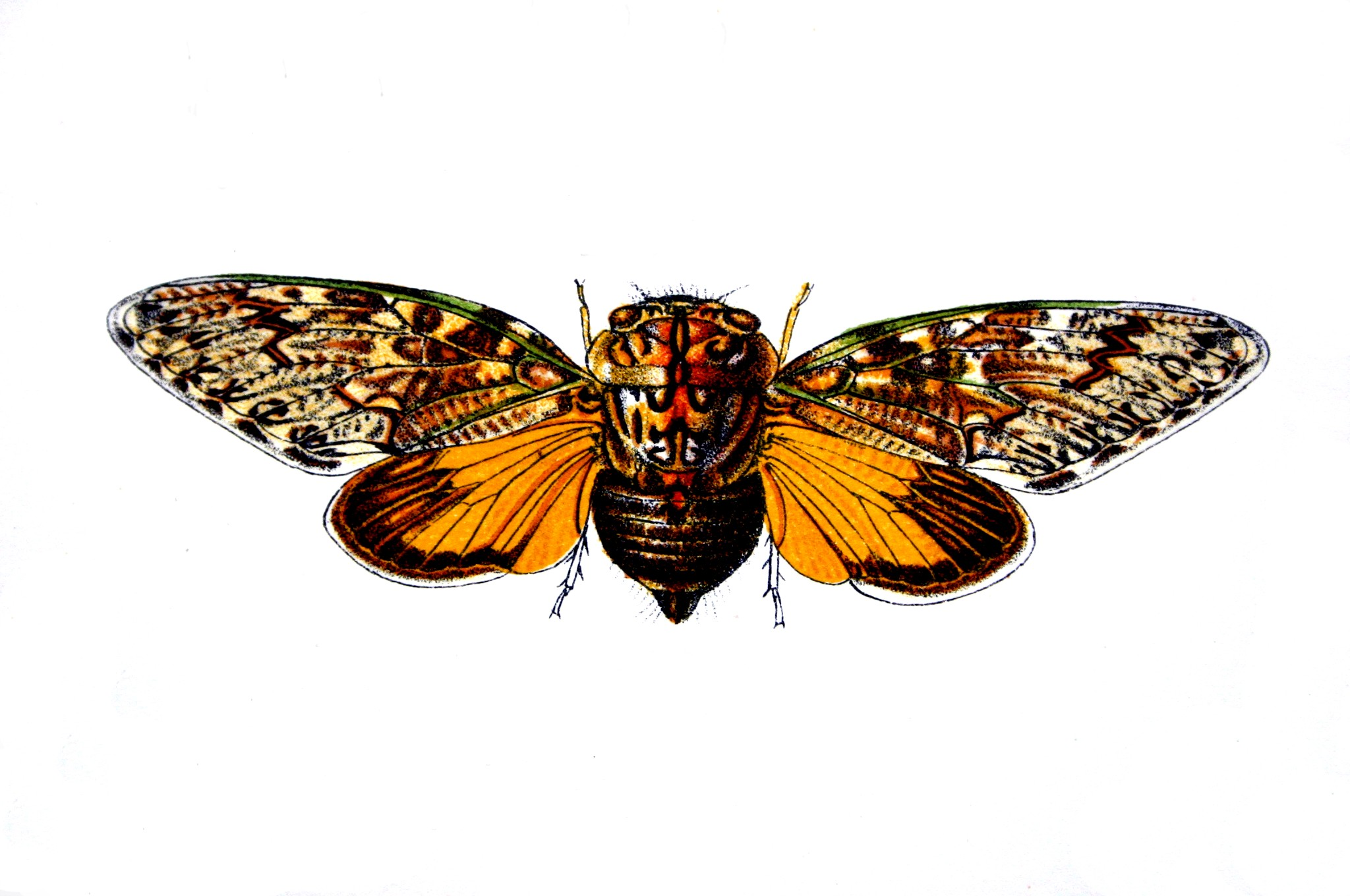
- Platypleura divisa

Scientific classification
- Kingdom: Animalia
- Phylum: Arthropoda
- Clade: Pancrustacea
- Class: Insecta
- Order: Hemiptera
- Suborder: Auchenorrhyncha
- Superfamily: Cicadoidea
- Family: Cicadidae
- Subfamily: Cicadinae
- Tribe: Platypleurini; Schmidt, 1918

Synonyms
- List: Hainanosemiaria Kato, 1927; Hainanosemiiti [sic] Distant, 1905; Hamzaini Distant, 1905; Hamzaini [sic] Distant, 1905; Hamzaria Distant, 1905; Orapini Boulard, 1985; Platypleuraria Schmidt, 1918; Platypleurinae Schmidt, 1918; Platypleuriti [sic] Schmidt, 1918; Platypleurnae [sic] Schmidt, 1918

= Platypleurini =

Platypleurini Temporal range: Eocene–Recent

Tribe of true bugs

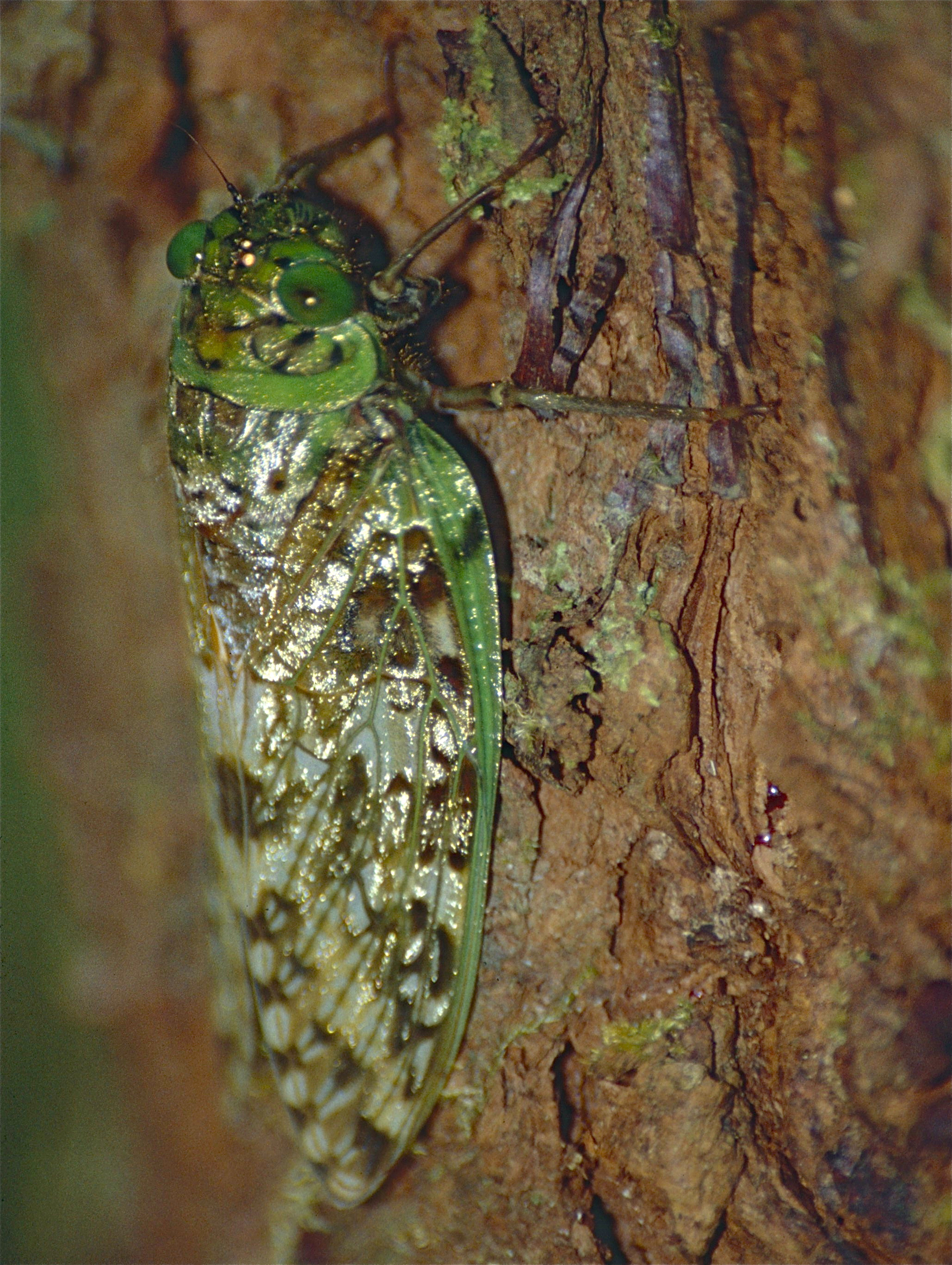
Yanga andriana

The Platypleurini are a tribe of cicadas from the Afrotropical and Indomalayan realms. There are at least 240 described species in Platypleurini. The earliest member of the group is the fossil cicada Eoplatypleura, from the Eocene aged Messel Pit locality of Germany, which is also the oldest confirmed member of Cicadinae and one of the oldest Cicadids known from Eurasia.

== Genera ==
The following belong to the tribe Platypleurini:

1. Afzeliada Boulard, 1973
2. Albanycada Villet, 1989
3. Attenuella Boulard, 1973
4. Azanicada Villet, 1989
5. Brevisiana Boulard, 1973
6. Canualna Boulard, 1985
7. Capcicada Villet, 1989
8. Dyticopycna Sanborn, 2020
9. Eopycna Sanborn, 2020
10. Esada Boulard, 1973
11. Hainanosemia Kato, 1927
12. Hamza Distant, 1904
13. Ioba Distant, 1904
14. Kalabita Moulton, 1923
15. Karscheliana Boulard, 1990
16. Koma Distant, 1904
17. Kongota Distant, 1904
18. Muansa Distant, 1904
19. Munza Distant, 1904
20. Neoplatypleura Kato, 1926
21. Orapa Distant, 1905
22. Oxypleura Amyot & Audinet-Serville, 1843
23. Planopleura Lee, 2024
24. Platypleura Amyot & Audinet-Serville, 1843 (synonym Tugelana Distant, 1912)
25. Pycna Amyot & Audinet-Serville, 1843
26. Sadaka Distant, 1904
27. Sechellalna Boulard, 2010
28. Severiana Boulard, 1973
29. Soudaniella Boulard, 1973
30. Strumosella Boulard, 1973
31. Strumoseura Villet, 1999
32. Suisha Kato, 1928
33. Tigripleura Lee, 2024
34. Ugada Distant, 1904
35. Umjaba Distant, 1904
36. Yanga Distant, 1904
