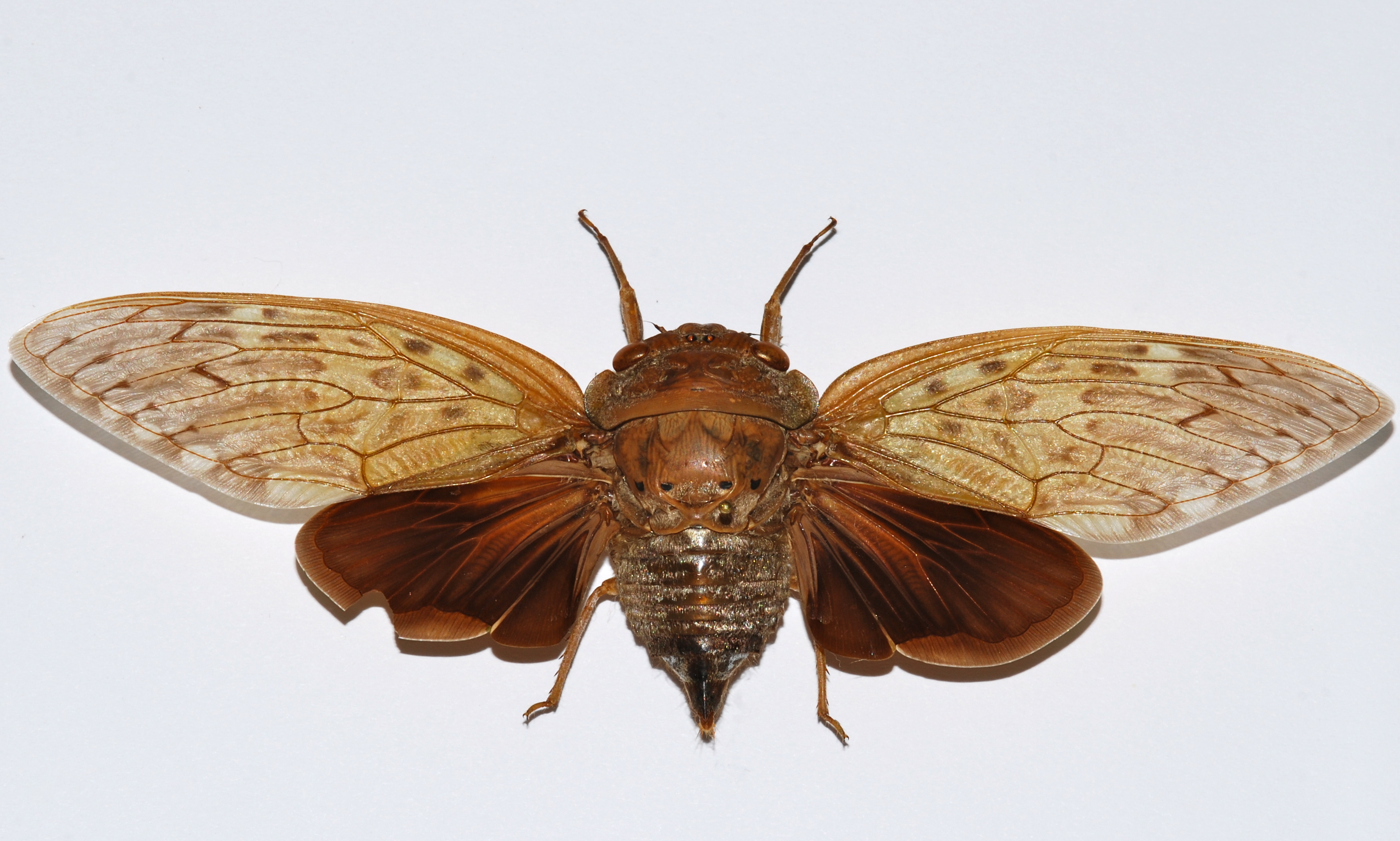
- Pycna strix

Scientific classification
- Domain: Eukaryota
- Kingdom: Animalia
- Phylum: Arthropoda
- Class: Insecta
- Order: Hemiptera
- Suborder: Auchenorrhyncha
- Family: Cicadidae
- Subfamily: Cicadinae
- Tribe: Platypleurini
- Genus: Pycna; Amyot & Serville, 1843

Species
- See text

= Pycna =

Genus of true bugs

Pycna is a genus of cicadas in the tribe Platypleurini, from Madagascar.

== Species ==
The World Auchenorrhyncha Database includes:

1. Pycna ambrensis Boulard, 2022
2. Pycna angusta (Butler, 1882)
3. Pycna gigas (Distant, 1881)
4. Pycna itremensis Boulard, 2008
5. Pycna madagascariensis (Distant, 1879)
6. Pycna roussettalna Boulard, 2022
7. Pycna rudis (Karsch, 1890)
8. Pycna strix Amyot & Audinet-Serville, 1843 - type species

Note at least three Asian species, previously placed here, are now in genus Eopycna; species from mainland Africa are now placed in Dyticopycna Sanborn, 2020.
