= Woodchipping in Australia =

Australian timber export sector

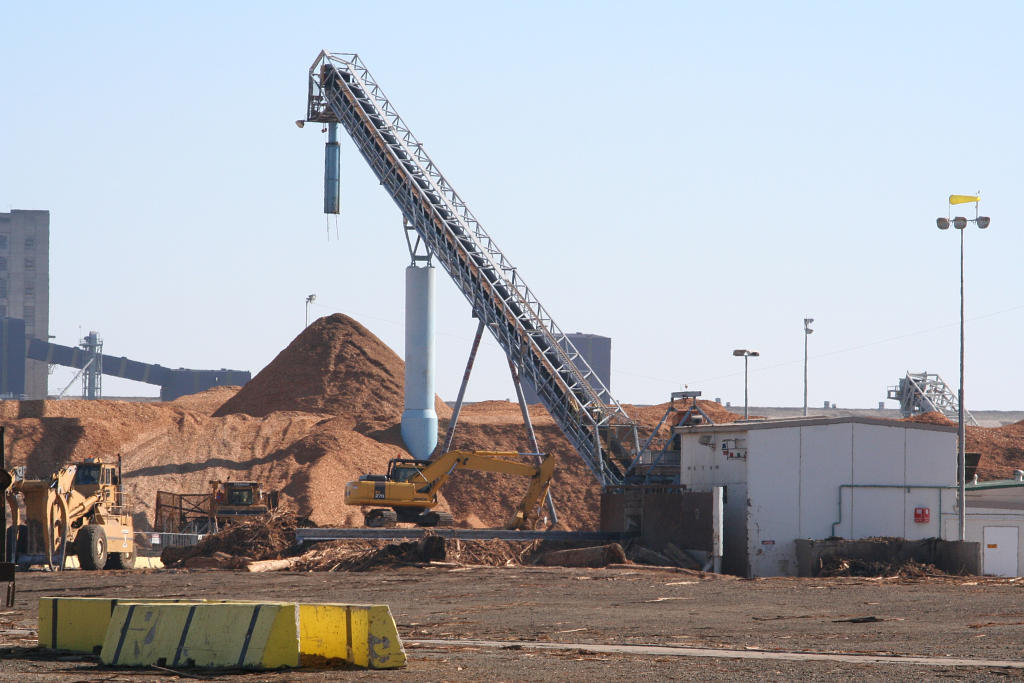
Woodchipping plant at the Port of Geelong, Australia

Woodchipping is the act and industry of chipping wood for pulp. Timber is converted to woodchips and sold, primarily, for paper manufacture. In Australia, woodchips are produced by clearcutting or thinning of native forests or plantations. In other parts of the world, forestry practices such as short rotation coppice are the usual methods adopted.

Uses of wood chips include the manufacture of particle board (or "chip board") and other engineered woods, mulch and fuel.

== Sources and process ==
Historically, the primary sources of wood chips in Australia have been the extensive Eucalyptus hardwood forests found throughout temperate areas of the country. In more recent times, a significant proportion comes from managed hardwood and softwood plantations.

During the late 1960s and 1970s, the high demand for paper and the relatively low cost and availability of the native forests made the establishment of a woodchipping industry a viable proposition. Conversely, the establishment of a woodchipping industry made it economically feasible to clearfell areas of mixed or substandard forest that could not otherwise have been felled. Clearfelling is a controversial forest practice in Australia, and opponents argue that the woodchipping industry is culpable for its continuation.

Woodchips are converted into a fibre that can be made into various grades of paper or rayon for the textile industry. Most processing and value adding takes place outside of Australia. The Australian economy benefits directly from a low-cost and high-volume export commodity.

== Usage ==
Wood chips, as a byproduct of the timber industry, have been used in many ways for centuries, for example as a material for the production of wallpaper or as a disposable floor covering in butchers shop or drinking houses. Wood pulp is the primary market for the woodchipping industry in Australia.

The practice, known as woodchipping, was to make use of most of the woody material in a tree to produce wood chips. This was then converted into paper, hardwood pulp is mainly used for printing paper and softwood pulp is added for good quality. An energy-intensive process, it also involved the use of bleaches and other toxic chemicals. This stage of the process, known as Kraft pulping, was primarily performed in Japan and elsewhere. High demand for paper products had purpose-built bulk carriers increase the export of woodchips from Australia to Japan.

The separation of the chipping stage and the pulping and paper mills required the supply of energy usually sourced from byproducts of the process. Additional energy expenditure is found in the shipping of raw materials and export of the finished product.

== Criticism and environmental opposition ==
The introduction of the wood chip industry to Western Australia in the 1960s initially attracted less opposition than it did in the eastern states. At first it was seen as an opportunity for the economic development of the south west; it was not until the 1970s that an environmental movement against it began to emerge. The volatility of the issue became apparent in 1976 when two activists carried out the Bunbury woodchip bombing, a failed attempt to disable woodchip exporting facilities for 18 months. Following decades of campaigning by environmental groups and others commercial forestry within native forests, including for woodchipping, was ended in Western Australia and eastern Victoria in 2024.

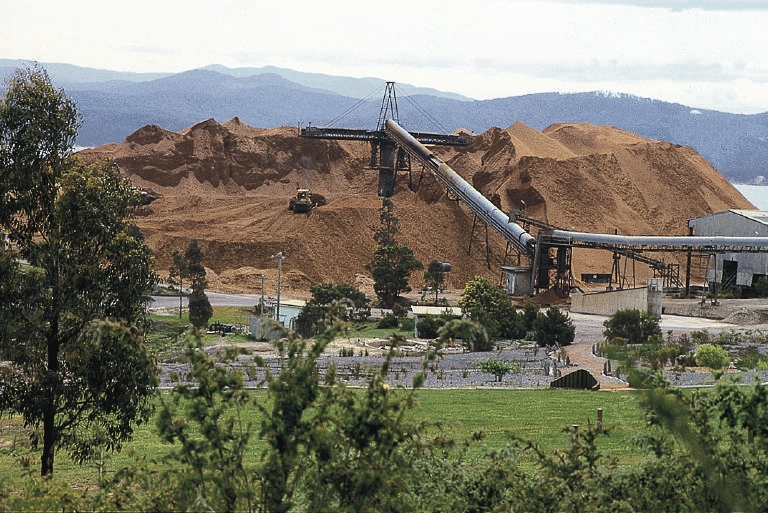
Woodchips, Eden, New South Wales

== See also ==
- Land clearing in Australia
- Logging
- Woodchipper

=== Woodchip mill companies and locations ===
- Eden, New South Wales
- North Shore, Victoria
- Longreach, Tasmania
- Bell Bay, Tasmania
- Hampshire, Tasmania
- Gunns
- W.A. Chip & Pulp Co
- Wesley Vale pulp mill

=== Woodchip critics and opponents ===
- Australian Greens
- Australian Conservation Foundation
- Campaign to Save Native Forests
- Conservation Council of Western Australia
- Great Walk Networking
- Liberals for Forests
- South West Forests Defence Foundation
- Western Australian Forests Alliance

== Notes ==
- Australian Bureau of Agricultural and Resource Economics (15 November 2005). "Australian Forest and Wood Product Statistics. March–June quarters 2005" (PDF). abareconomics. pp. 50–51. ISSN 1449-1850. Archived from the original (PDF) on 2006-05-06. "Total woodchips; Quantity 2002-03, 03-04, 04-05- China: 67.6 0.0 69.6 0.0 Japan kt 4 790.0 4 653.7 4 997.3 Other kt 579.5 610.2 531.4 Total kt 5 437.1 5 263.9 5 598.3 (emphasis added)
  Quarters 2004-05 a Pulpwood logs are included in the table exports of roundwood. b Broadleaved woodchip volumes were confidential from February 2000 to May 2000. From 1 June 2000, ABS have applied selected country and state restrictions to broadleaved woodchip exports. From February 2003 all state details are confidential. c Bone dry tonnes. na Not available. Sources: ABS, International Trade, Australia, cat. no. 5465.0, Canberra; ABARE."
- The Wilderness Society (2001-01-25). "Implications of Selling Native Forests for 9 Cents a Tonne". Tasmanian Forests. Archived from the original on 2006-10-08. "The Wilderness Society has revealed today that Forestry Tasmania is planning to clearfell and woodchip areas of pure rainforest in north-west Tasmania and then convert the cleared areas to plantations."
- Open Mind Research Group on behalf of their client Environment Victoria (1994-12-04). "Woodchipping to Japan - Joint Environment Group Commissioned Public Opinion". Forest Fact File. "Newspoll - December 1994 - To the Question "Next a question about native forests. Do you personally approve or disapprove of trees from Australian's native forests being fell and exported as woodchips to Japan? 80.3% of Australians disapproved, 11.7% approved, 8.0% undecided."
- Wilson "Ironbar" Tuckey MP (2000-09-28). "Tuckey writes to Tasmania Together committee over woodchipping - Media release". Media Releases The Hon Wilson Tuckey MP Former Minister for Forestry and Conservation. Archived from the original on 2006-09-17. "Mr Tuckey was responding to reports in the Launceston Examiner suggesting the phasing out of woodchipping in Tasmania. Press reports in the United States are quoting well known green activists as saying that the US fires, including forest and property destruction, are the result of past forest management policies that prevented harvesting. This has created 'cadaverous' forests overpopulated with sick, dead and skinny trees — the perfect fuel for a wildfire."
- Warwick Frost (1997-03-03). "Review of John Dargavel, Fashioning Australia's forests, Melbourne: Oxford University Press, 1995". The Electronic Journal of Australian and New Zealand History. School of Humanities, James Cook University. ISSN 1321-5752. "The export of woodchips from Australian native forests over the last few decades has been one of Australia's greatest economic and environmental disasters. Heavily subsidised and poorly managed, wood chipping has continued despite the trend amongst Australia's policy makers towards the rhetoric of economic rationalism. Even though only those with a vested interest could argue for wood chipping on economic grounds, it has managed to gain the strong support of both Labour and Liberal/National Parties. Yet despite these contradictions and the enormous passion the wood chipping debate generates, historians have tended to ignore this issue. John Dargavel's excellent history of Australian forestry goes a long way to filling this gap. Dr Warwick Frost lectures in the School of Economics, La Trobe University."
