= Beth Schultz =

Australian environmentalist

Beth Schultz AO
- Born: 1936 (age 88–89); Roma, Queensland, Australia
- Occupation: Environmentalist
- Known for: Protection of the karri forests in south-west Western Australia
- Awards: Bessie Rischbieth Conservation Award, 2012

Beth Schultz AO (born 1936) is an Australian environmentalist. She has campaigned for the preservation of the karri forests in the south-west of Western Australia since 1975.

== Early life and education ==
Schultz was born in Roma, Queensland in 1936. She completed her education at boarding school, where she was head prefect. Her first degree was a BA in romance languages. She holds a further four degrees, including an LLB which she took "because she thought the environment movement needed a lawyer".

== Career ==
Schultz began lobbying to protect karri forests in the south-west of Western Australia in 1975 from woodchipping. At that time she was instrumental in the launch of the South West Forests Defence Foundation, while in the 1980s she worked to protect the Shannon National Park and in the 1990s was a significant contributor to the WA Forest Alliance. She served as president of the Conservation Council of Western Australia for three years.

Schultz was interviewed in 1994 by Gregg Borschmann for the people's forest oral history project. The recording and typescript are held in the National Library of Australia.

As of 2022 Schultz is a committee member of the West Australian Forest Alliance.

== Awards and recognition ==
Schultz was awarded the Centenary Medal in 2001 for "service to the preservation of the natural environment". She was appointed an Officer of the Order of Australia in the 2007 Queen's Birthday Honours for "service to conservation and the environment in Western Australia, particularly through the protection of the South West old growth forests". Schultz was presented the 2012 Bessie Rischbieth Conservation Award by the Conservation Council of Western Australia.

== Selected works ==
- Schultz, Beth (August 1981), "Vanishing Karri", Environment WA, 4 (August 1981): 12–15
- Schultz, Beth (May 1982), "The legal challenge to the woodchip propagandists", Environment WA, 4 (May 1982): 39–43
- Schultz, Beth (1 May 1991), "Jarrah magic is being lost", Forest Reporter, 1 (1): 16
- Schultz, Beth (1992), "Overseas action to save Australia's native forests", Wilderness News (Hobart) (129): 6–7
- Robertson, Peter; Schultz, Beth (1 February 1998), "WA forest showdown looms", Habitat Australia, 26 (1), Australian Conservation Foundation: 21(1), ISSN 0310-2939
- Schultz, Beth (March 1999), "WA's celebrity forests (The mainstream fight to save WA's old-growth forests)", Chain Reaction (78): 38–42, ISSN 0312-1372
- Schultz, Beth (2006), "Fire in the Natural Environment", Australasian Plant Conservation: Journal of the Australian Network for Plant Conservation, 14 (4): 26–27, ISSN 1039-6500
- Schultz, Beth (December 2013), "The fight for the forests: 40 years on and still going", Chain Reaction (119): 22, ISSN 0312-1372
- Wardell-Johnson, Grant; Wardell-Johnson, Angela; Schultz, Beth; Dortch, Joe; Robinson, Todd; Collard, Len; Calver, Michael (2019), The contest for the tall forests of South-Western Australia and the discourses of advocates
