= Bunbury woodchip bombing =

1976 ecoterrorism incident in Western Australia

- Front page of the South Western Times, 20 July 1976
- Date: 19 July 1976
- Time: 5:25am
- Location: Bunbury, Western Australia; 33°19′23″S 115°39′23″E
- Type: Bombing
- Motive: Protection of old growth forests
- Target: Woodchip loader, Bunbury Port
- Participants: Michael Haabjoern and John Chester
- Outcome: Partial damage to woodchip loading facilities, malfunction of two additional bombs
- Property damage: $300,000 (AUD) (approx $1.8 million in 2015)

A politically motivated bombing took place on 19 July 1976 at a woodchip export terminal in Bunbury, Western Australia. More than 1,000 sticks of gelignite were planted by two environmental protesters, with the resulting partial detonation causing an estimated $300,000 in damage.

Two charges failed to detonate which limited the bombing's impact. No injuries were reported, although a security guard was held at gunpoint and shrapnel impacted a nearby residential area. The intention of the bombing was to prevent the export of woodchips from Western Australian old growth forests for 18 months. While later regarded as largely unknown outside of Western Australia, it was considered to have been a serious setback for the emerging environmental movement at the time, despite the perpetrators being unaffiliated with any environmental organisation.

== Background ==
The introduction of the wood chip industry to Western Australia in the 1960s initially attracted less opposition than it did in the Eastern states. This started to change in the 1970s. When woodchipping began around the town of Manjimup in 1975, local residents Michael Haabjoern and John Chester felt they had no recourse by legal means of stopping the destruction of the old growth forests.

== The bombing ==
On the morning of 19 July 1976, Michael Haabjoern and John Chester arrived in Bunbury, having driven a stolen car from Manjimup. The car contained more than 1,000 sticks of gelignite, fuses, detonators and timing devices stolen from a Perth magazine. The motive of the protesters was to destroy the port's loading facilities and prevent the export of woodchips from Western Australia's old-growth karri and jarrah forests for at least 18 months. During that time they hoped to create a groundswell of opposition to the woodchipping industry with laws passed to prevent it in future.

Wearing stocking masks and armed with a .303 rifle, the two men cut through the fencing and held up the watchman, Trevor Morritt, at gunpoint. Haabjoern set the charges at three critical points of the machinery and informed the watchman of their plans whilst also checking whether any personnel would be passing through the site. They then left the facility in Morritt's car, taking him with them. Morritt would later describe Chester as agitated and a "loose cannon", whereas Haabjoern was "fairly cool and calm".

On the access road they placed two signs reading "Danger Separate Explosives" and "Danger Charges Ahead" and left the watchman 9 km away in Australind. At 5:25 am the first charge detonated, causing damage estimated at $300,000 (equivalent to $2,100,000 in 2022) to the gantry structure and sending steel pieces over the Leschenault inlet into a housing estate, smashing windows. The remaining two charges failed to detonate.

== Aftermath ==
The facilities were not critically damaged and the port was able to resume exports with barely an interruption. The remaining explosives were defused by bomb expert Jack Billing, who was flown to Bunbury from Perth. Meanwhile police located Haabjoern and Chester within a week. In court, the two men pleaded guilty to the charges whilst justifying their actions with the argument that limited violence against industrial equipment would prevent greater violence against the unique environmental heritage of Western Australia's native forests. The two men were sentenced to seven years imprisonment, with a minimum term of ten months. Justice Jones said that he believed that the two men had been motivated by a higher ideal and were unlikely to commit the same offence again. This attracted criticism for being too lenient and an appeal by the Crown led to an increase in the minimum term to three and a half years.

Neither Haabjoern or Chester were affiliated with any environmental organisation, however, the bombing allowed opponents of the emerging movement to characterize all protesters as violent extremists. GW Kelly of the Forest Products Association said that the incident had been caused by extremists who "inflamed emotions with a campaign of bitterness and hatred, divorced almost entirely from the truth." Premier Charles Court considered the bombing to be an act of terrorism whereas the WA Police treated it as "just" a criminal act. Both the Campaign to Save Native Forests and the South West Forests Defence Foundation distanced themselves from the bombing and reaffirmed a commitment to protest by lawful means.

Chester would later escape from Geraldton Regional Prison on 3 February 1978. Inquiries were made throughout Australia, with Sydney detectives suggesting he could be a suspect in the Hilton Hotel bombing. WA Police however thought it unlikely for him to have left the state, and a man hunt took place in and around Manjimup where Chester was located on 13 March. Chester once again escaped from the custody the following day and went into hiding in the bush. Chester made contact with a journalist and issued threats against the Premier Charles Court, mining magnate Lang Hancock and said he might blow up a woodchip train.
