= W.A. Chip & Pulp Co. =

The W.A. Chip & Pulp Company was founded in 1969 to export woodchips from sustainable bluegum plantations after the Government of Western Australia granted a Bunnings led consortium rights to establish a woodchip project in Manjimup. In August 2000, the business was sold to Marubeni.

Before it was able to commence, environmental concerns had to be addressed, and considerable concern was raised by organisations that opposed the project. The Campaign to Save Native Forests, South West Forests Defence Foundation, and Conservation Council of Western Australia all published materials questioning the soundness of the project. As a consequence, within a few years of commencing operation, regular environmental reviews were carried out to monitor the effect of the operation.

The company has maintained production for three decades, and has utilised port facilities at Bunbury for the export of its product.

== Publication ==
- Woodchip news Perth [W.A.] : (unknown frequency) Dec. 1973, May 1974, Mar. 1975.
