= Forestry mulching =

Soil improvement and conservation methodologies

Time-lapse of Tigercat mulcher clearing brush

Forestry mulching is a land clearing method that uses a single machine to cut, grind, and clear vegetation.

A forestry mulching machine, also referred to as a forestry mulcher, forest masticator, or brushcutter, uses a rotary drum equipped with steel chipper tools ("teeth") or blades to shred vegetation. They are manufactured as application-specific tractors and as mulching attachments (“mulching heads”) for existing tracked and rubber-tired forestry tractors, skid steers, or excavators.

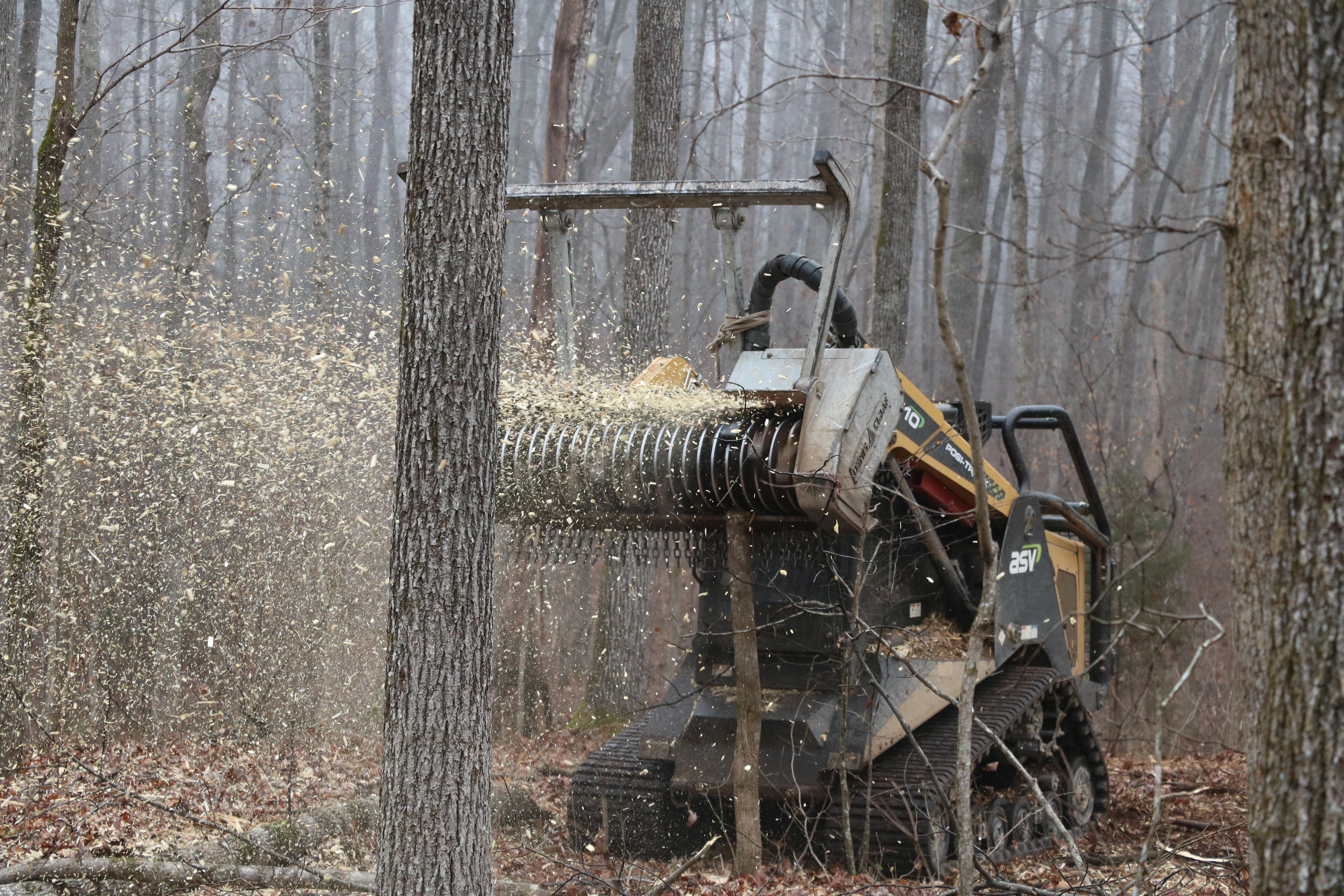
ASV RT-110 and DAF-180D clearing private property in Georgia

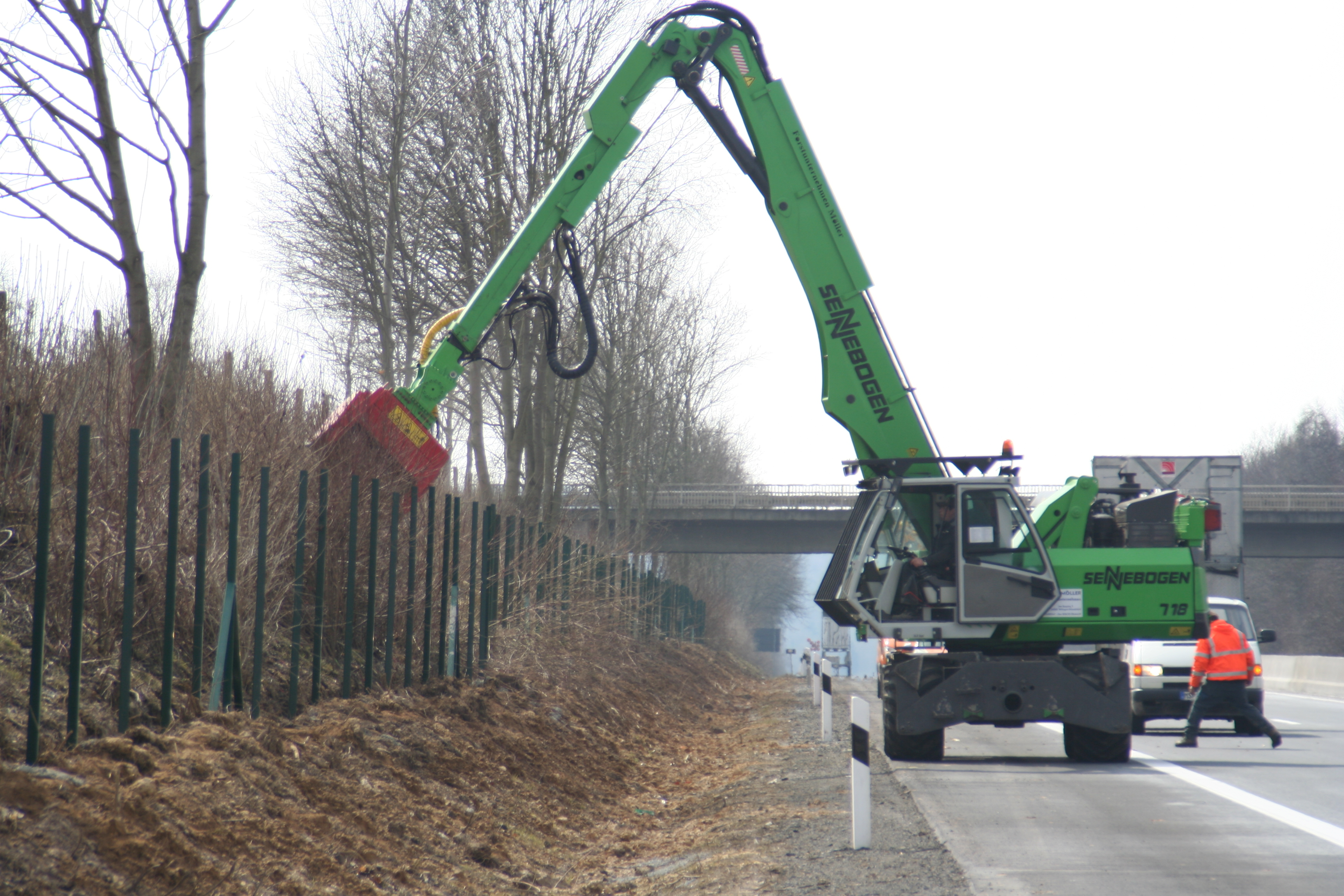
Fecon mulching attachment on a Sennebogen excavator, being used to clear roadside brush in Germany

Heavy duty forestry mulchers can clear up to 10 acres of vegetation a day depending on terrain, density, and type of material. Forestry mulchers are often used for land clearing, right-of-way, pipeline/power line, wildfire prevention and management, vegetation management, invasive species control, and wildlife restoration.

When the growth being cleared is a mix of leaves and grass, a Blower/Vacuum/Mulcher unit, rather than a chipper, offers a choice of gas-powered or powerered by electricity, which can be corded or cordless.

== Applications of forestry mulching ==
=== Right-of-way clearing and maintenance ===
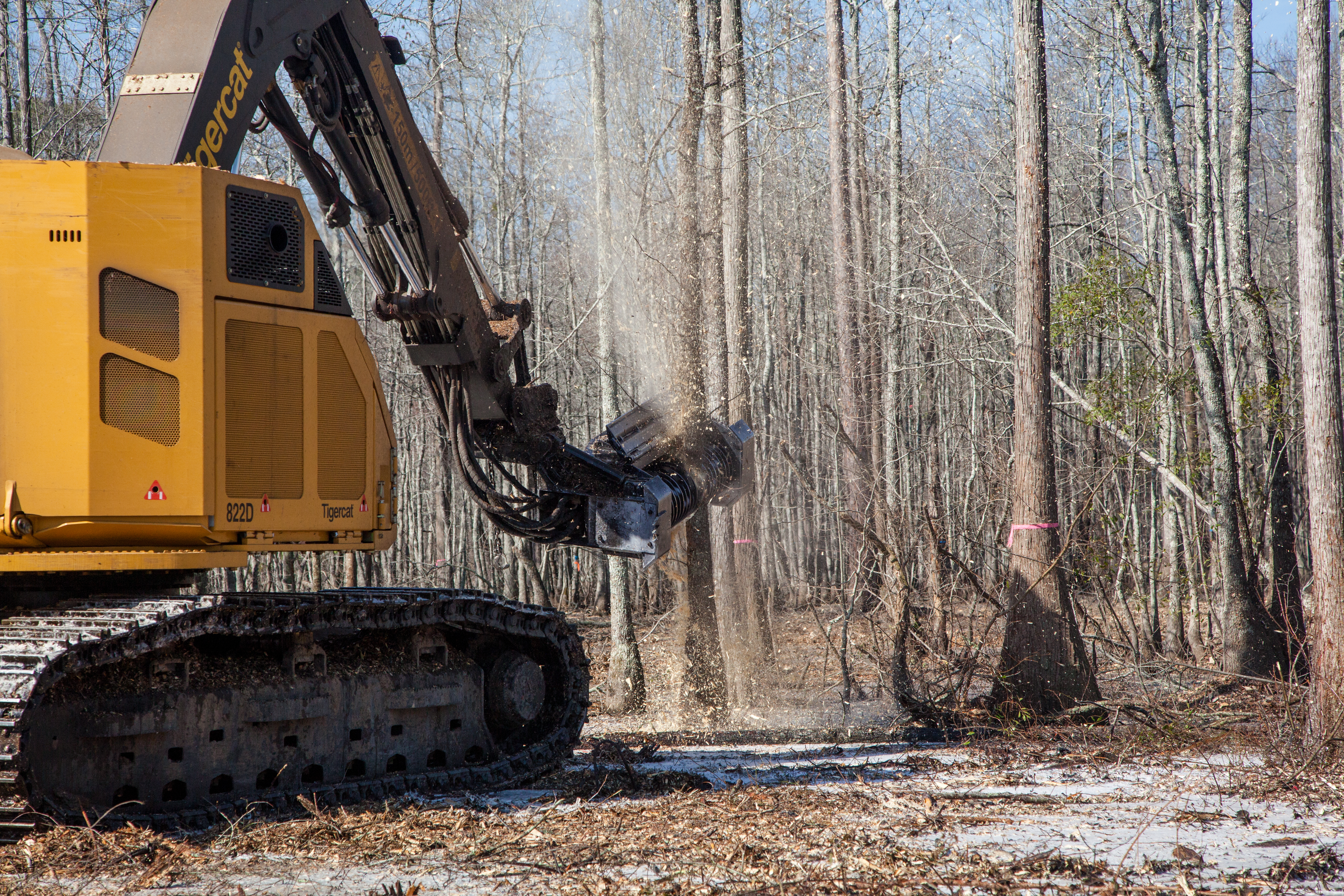
An example of a tilting bracket

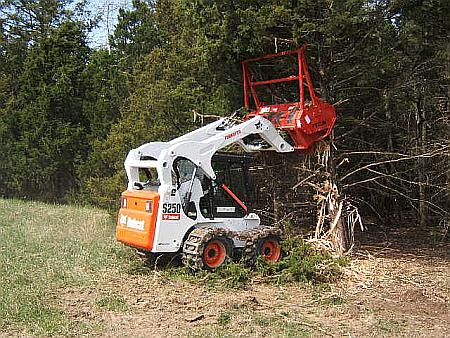
Forestry mulching attachment on a Bobcat skid steer

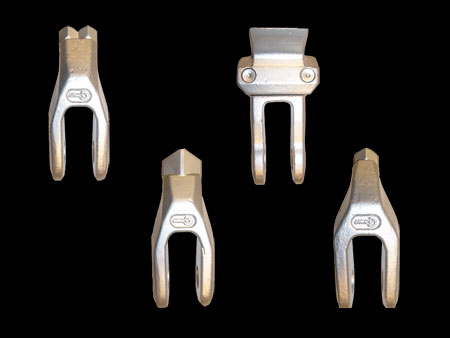
Examples of chipper tools ("teeth") available on forestry mulching attachments

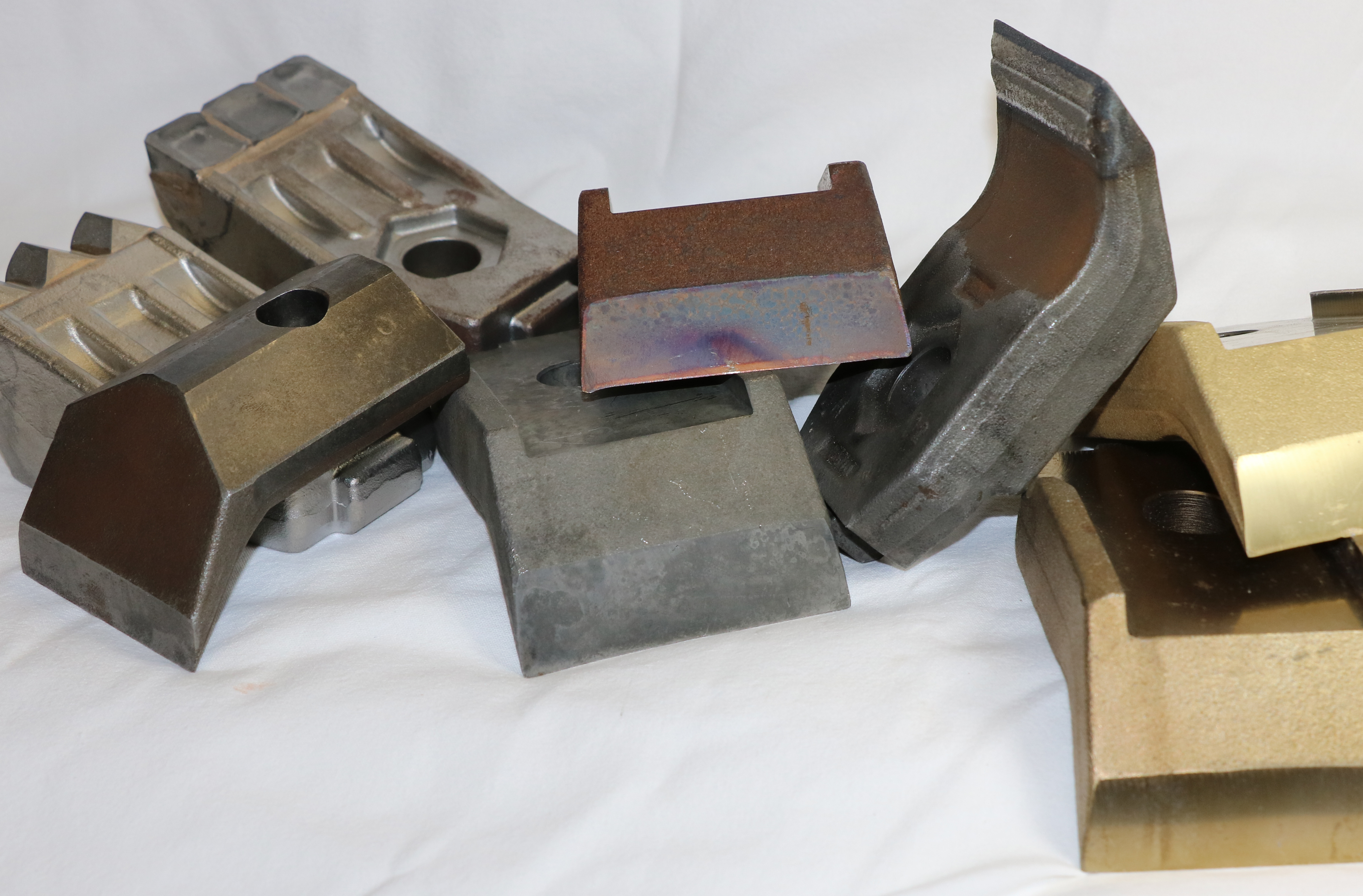
Example of blade and hammer selection used in forestry mulching

Forestry mulching is used in the right-of-way clearing and maintenance for roads, highways, pipelines, and other utility lines. This process often requires complete removal of standing trees, stumps, and vegetation. The goal is improved soil, and it is accomplished "by shredding leaves with a mower and piling them up to age".

=== Land clearing ===
This method can be used in commercial and residential land clearing projects such as site preparation and development, cutting and clearing brush, nature and recreational trail creation, and seismic exploration.

=== Wetlands and riparian habitat conservation ===
Forestry mulching has become popular among non-profit riparian conservation organizations, government agencies, hunt clubs, and private landowners in attempts to maintain habitats for pheasants, doves, elk, deer, and various other animals. Maintaining an animal habitat encompasses several different aspects: food, water, shelter, and space, and there are many products that can help reclaim and maintain wildlife habitats for these animals.

- Food: Forestry mulchers and forestry mowers are often used for removing underbrush and invasive species, such as buckthorn and multiflora rose, in order to allow the rejuvenation of grasses and other eating sources.
- Water: Forestry mulchers and tree shears can be used to restore water source access that has been blocked due to tree and understory growth, allowing animals to access the water.
- Shelter and space: Mulching can remove invasive underbrush that prevents the growth of the grasses required by certain animals for shelter, breeding, escaping the summer heat, and protecting themselves from cold temperatures.

=== Invasive species control ===
Some common invasive plants such as tamarisk (salt cedar), Pinyon-juniper, Russian olive, red cedar, buckthorn, and multiflora rose can establish in a natural habitat, soak up a tremendous amount of groundwater. This may merit removing the plants using mulchers to re-establish the native habitat or to preserve the water table. Invasive insects such as pine beetles can also devastate forests, leaving behind rotting trees with diminishing timber value and that may become falling hazards if they lose their ability to stand up against wind.

Proactive mulching can reduce tree stress caused by crowding, making them less susceptible to attack from invasive species. Mulching invasive species in place can control the spread of invasive plants, insects, and fungus. The mulching action tends to discharge the material downward and within a reasonably confined area, versus other methods such as rotary cutters that may laterally disperse pine beetles or other invasive species into neighbouring healthy trees.

=== Wildfire prevention and management ===
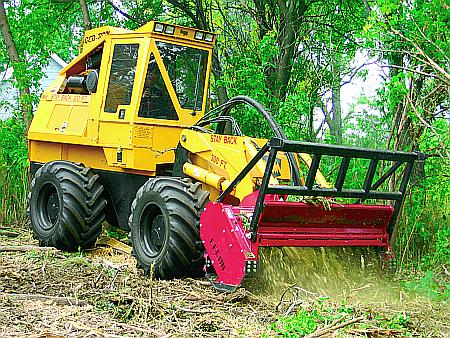
Hydraulic-powered mulching attachment on rubber-tired tractor

- Proactive mulching: Mulching reduces the potential for wildfires by eliminating small leafy plants, fallen or rotten trees, and other fuel sources. If left untreated, these fuel loads increase potential for fire, increase the heat intensity, and serve as fire ladders that enable fire to elevate quickly to the tops of trees which is where a fire can spread most quickly. Mulching can also be used to create a coarse grind finish that can create a more ideal controlled burn.
- Reactive mulching: In addition to proactive thinning of vegetation to mitigate fire fuels, forestry mulching can be used for reactive cutting of lines (fire breaks) on active fires. Larger forestry mulchers leave minimal clean-up requirements and can help reduce the overall costs of active fire mitigation.
- Clean-up: After the fire is out and clean-up efforts are underway, tracked forestry mulching machines, mulching attachments, and an excavator with a mulching attachment can provide a top layer of mulch to prevent soil erosion on slopes and minimize water pollution.

== Disadvantages and advantages of forestry mulching ==
The New York Times published in 2022 that the American market for mulch compostings is $1 billion (per year). In 2005 they estimated that the average paid per cubic yard was $25.

=== Disadvantages of forestry mulching ===
Depending on the size and orientation of the mulching head, forestry mulchers can only fell smaller trees. Mulchers with a mulching head that rotates about a vertical axis can typically handle trees up to 6–8 inches (15–20 cm) in diameter, while mulchers with a mulching head that rotates about a horizontal axis can handle trees up to 30 inches (76 cm) in diameter. Mulching trees at the upper end of this size range can be dangerous for both the equipment and the operator. Some excavator mulching attachments are equipped with a tilting bracket that significantly reduces the risk of felling trees larger than those desired. Mulching areas with a variety of vegetation and terrain may require multiple pieces of equipment, including tracked mulching machines, excavator mulchers, and skid steer tractors equipped with mulching attachments.

Rocks and stones cannot be processed or moved by the machines, and the teeth grinding against rocky ground can both wear out and cause fire hazards. Blades, hammers, and teeth are replaceable and considered wear parts. Smaller rocks and other debris can be thrown through the air, and while these are usually deflected by a protective shroud, they can present a danger to the operator and surrounding people and structures.

Even for the largest machines, mulching is only effective when less than 25 tons of vegetation or 100 trees are present per acre.

Although mulching is significantly faster and less labor-intensive than land clearing by hand, it requires the site to have road access for fueling and maintenance.

=== Advantages ===
By processing trees and other vegetation where they stand, mulching machines eliminate many of the steps involved in land clearing such as site prep, cutting, felling, hauling, and site clean-up. This also eliminates the need for multiple machines such as bulldozers accompanied by some combination of excavators, tree shears, wood chippers or grinders, and hauling equipment. On simpler jobs only one mulching machine is required, reducing fuel requirements and emissions.

Some mulching machines also have the ability to operate on steep slopes and in small or tight areas, in poor ground conditions, and in wet or snowy weather.

Mulching machines are capable of clearing land of unwanted trees and brush with limited disturbance to soils or desirable vegetation.

Traditional land clearing methods often present an increased risk of erosion by pushing over trees, uprooting the stump and roots, and substantially disturbing soils. In contrast, mulching the vegetation leaves the soil structure intact. The mulched material can be left on the ground and will act as an erosion barrier while returning nutrients back into the soil through decomposition. Over time, grass will naturally grow through the mulch and can be maintained with mowing.

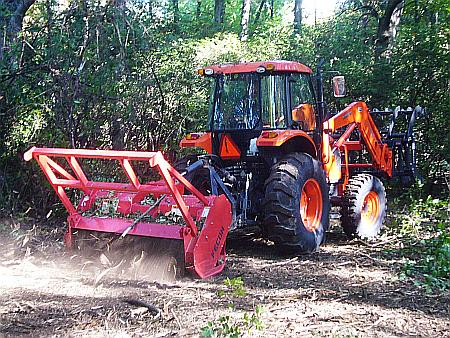
PTO-driven forestry mulching attachment on an agricultural tractor

== See also ==
- Ramial chipped wood
- Woodchipper
