= Jess Beckerling =

Australian politician

The Honourable Jess Beckerling MLC

Member of the Western Australian Legislative Council
- Incumbent
- Assumed office 22 May 2025

Personal details
- Born: Johannesburg, South Africa
- Party: Greens (WA)
- Education: Murdoch University
- Occupation: Politician
- Website: Greens WA

Jessica Beckerling (born 1983) is an Australian politician and environmental campaigner. A member of the Greens (WA), she was elected to the Western Australian Legislative Council in 2025. Beckerling has been instrumental in shaping environmental policy in Western Australia, particularly through her leadership in the campaign to end native forest logging.

== Early life and education ==
Beckerling became involved in conservation work as a teenager, participating in forest blockades across the south-west of Western Australia. She holds a Bachelor of Environmental Science from Murdoch University, with a focus on ecology and sustainability.

== Environmental advocacy ==
=== WA Forest Alliance and grassroots activism ===
Beckerling served as Convenor and Campaign Director of the WA Forest Alliance (WAFA) for 13 years. Under her leadership, WAFA played a central role in advocating for the protection of native forests, culminating in the WA Government’s decision to end native forest logging by January 2024. The campaign was recognised with the United Nations Association of Western Australia’s Environment Award in 2022.

Her grassroots approach, often involving community blockades and citizen action, helped to mobilise public support and elevate forest protection to a statewide policy issue.

=== Conservation Council of WA ===
In late 2023, Beckerling was appointed Executive Director of the Conservation Council of Western Australia (CCWA). Upon stepping into the role, she emphasized the urgency of improving WA’s climate and environmental performance and committed to rebuilding a strong, collaborative environmental movement through CCWA.

=== Recognition ===
Beckerling has received several awards for her contributions to environmental protection:

- United Nations Association of WA Environment Award (2022) – awarded to WAFA
- Bob Brown Foundation Environmentalist of the Year Award (2021)
- Bessie Rischbieth Conservation Award – Conservation Council of WA (2015)
- Inducted into the Western Australian Women's Hall of Fame (2023)

== State Parliament (2025–present) ==
Beckerling was elected to the Legislative Council in the 2025 state election, representing the Greens (WA).

Following the election, Beckerling and three other Greens MLCs hold the balance of power in the Legislative Council, significantly strengthening the party's influence on legislation.

In her inaugural speech on 17 June 2025, Beckerling acknowledged the traditional custodians of the land, the Whadjuk Noongar people, and emphasized truth, treaty, and justice for First Nations communities. She also highlighted the need for genuine commitments to environmental protection and social justice.

Beckerling has actively engaged with her community on environmental issues, including opposing Alcoa's proposed expansion of bauxite mining in WA's jarrah forests, citing concerns over environmental degradation and the state's net-zero emissions goals.

== Political positions ==
Beckerling supports:

- Ending native forest logging and restoring forest ecosystems
- Accelerating the transition to renewable energy and phasing out fossil fuels
- Protecting biodiversity and natural habitats
- Community-led environmental action and participatory decision-making
- Climate justice and equitable sustainability policies
