= SOML =

SOML may refer to:

- Save Our Marine Life, an Australian environmental advocacy organisation
- School of MAGTF Logistics at the U.S. Marine Corps University
- Steward Observatory Mirror Lab
- The Story of My Life (disambiguation)
- Semantic Objects Modeling Language - language for describing business objects defined by Ontotext
