= Tritucap =

The Tritucap (from Portuguese: Triturar de Capoeira, chipping of the underwood) is a secondary forest wood chipper used for land preparation in tropical agricultural systems. Its scope is to replace slash and burn practices in shifting cultivation settings, thus preventing soil erosion and displacement of nutrients.

The Tritucap was developed by the Institute of Agricultural Engineering of the University of Göttingen within the project "SHIFT Capoeira", funded by the German Federal Ministry of Education and Research.
