= Western Australian Forest Alliance =

Forest conservation advocacy group of Western Australia

The Western Australian Forest Alliance (also known as WAFA) is an organisation made up of a number of Western Australian environmental activist groups concerned with the destruction of old-growth forests in the South West region. It was founded in 1990 and now serves as the peak body for forest conservation in Western Australia.

== History ==
WAFA has published a range of guides, fact sheets, posters and documents, and is a successor to, and includes membership of, the earlier groups:

- Campaign to Save Native Forests
- South West Forests Defence Foundation
- Great Walk Networking
- other member groups of the Conservation Council of Western Australia

Advocacy and campaigning by WAFA and its members played a major role in the Western Australian Government deciding to end commercial logging of native forests in 2024.

WAFA is one organisation in the End Forest Mining alliance campaigning to end bauxite mining in Western Australia's northern jarrah forest.

== Affiliated groups ==
As of May 2023, WAFA lists the following member groups:

- Albany Community Environment Centre
- Balingup Friends of the Forest
- Barrabup Conservation Group
- Blackwood Environment Group
- Bridgetown-Greenbushes Friends of the Forest
- Busselton Dunsborough Environment Centre
- Conservation Council of Western Australia
- Denmark Environment Centre
- Dwellingup Discovery Forest Defenders
- Friends of the Earth WA
- Friends of Gelorup Corridor
- Friends of the Greater Kingston Forest
- Friends of Porongurup Ranges
- Great Walk Network
- Greater Beedelup National Park Society
- Jarrahdale Forest Protectors
- Margaret River Regional Environment Centre
- Nannas For Native Forests
- Peel Preservation Group
- Quinninup Environmental Documenting
- South Coast Environment Group
- South West Environment Centre
- South-West Forest Defence Foundation
- Stop the Forest Losses
- Warren Environment Group
- Wilderness Society WA

== Newsletter ==
- The Real forest news. Perth, W.A. : Western Australian Forest Alliance, 1992–1995. Ed. 1 (Dec. 1992)-ed. 6 (Feb. 1995).
- Forest campaign bulletin. Perth, W.A. : Western Australian Forest Alliance, 1994-
- Western Australian forest times. Perth, W.A. : Western Australian Forest Alliance, 1999 irregular

== See also ==
- Woodchipping

== Sources ==
- Beckerling, Jess (2021). "Winning Long-game, Collaborative, Grassroots Campaigns: the Wa Forest Campaign Experience". Commons Social Change Library.
- Conservation Council of Western Australia; Wilderness Society (W.A.); Western Australian Forest Alliance (1999). Forest Information Resource Kit : an Introduction to Some Key Issues in the Forest Debate in Western Australia. The Council.
- Hardinge, Alice; Beckerling, Jess (16 January 2024). "Campaigns to End Logging in Australia (Commons Conversations Podcasts)". The Commons Social Change Library.
- Western Australian Forest Alliance (1900). Western Australian Forest Alliance: Collection of Posters.
- Western Australian Forest Alliance (1995). Big Forest Rally. [s.n.].
- "The Alliance". Western Australian Forest Alliance. 2024.

== General references ==
- Crawford, Patricia; Crawford, Ian (2003). Contested Country: a History of the Northcliffe Area, Western Australia. Nedlands: University of Western Australia Press. ISBN 1-920694-00-5.
- Lines, William J. (2006). Patriots: Defending Australia's Natural Heritage. St. Lucia, Queensland: University of Queensland Press. ISBN 0-7022-3554-7.
- Schultz, Beth (1997). "Giblett Block: W.A. Forest Alliance Outlines the Significance of This Old Growth Forest and Reasons for its Preservation". Great Walk News. No. July 1997. Great Walk Networking. pp. 1–3.
