= BRF =

BRF may refer to:

== Businesses and organisations ==
- BRF S.A., a Brazilian food manufacturer
- Belgischer Rundfunk, a Belgian broadcaster
- Belt and Road Forum, China
- British royal family

== Science and technology ==
- Braille-Ready Format, a file format
- Bromine monofluoride, a chemical compound

== Transport ==
- Bâtiment ravitailleur de forces, a French warship class
- Broadford railway station, Australia (station code:BGP)

== Other uses ==
- Bitchy resting face, a facial expression
- Ramial chipped wood (French: Bois Raméal Fragmenté)
