= Woodchipper =

Machine for reducing wood into smaller woodchips

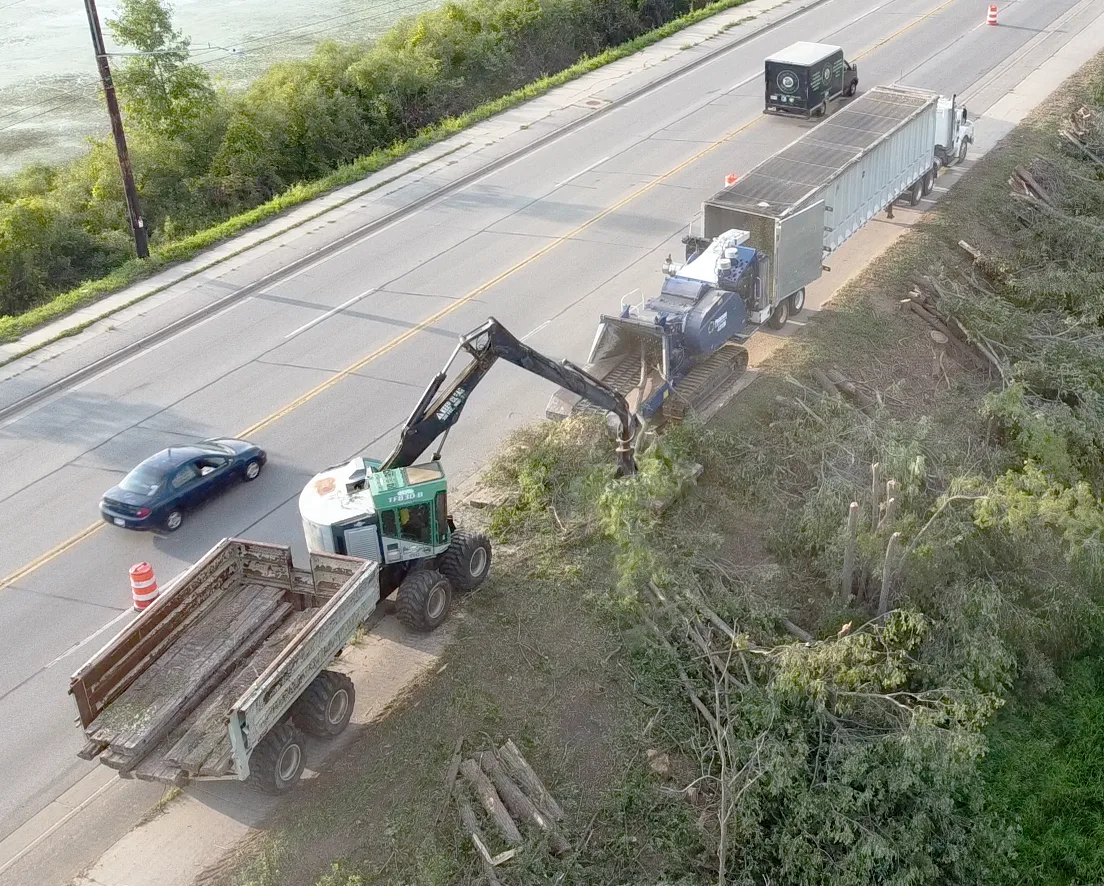
Woodchipper (click for video)

A tree chipper or woodchipper is a machine used for reducing wood (generally tree limbs or trunks) into smaller woodchips. They are often portable, being mounted on wheels on frames suitable for towing behind a truck or van. Power is generally provided by an internal combustion engine from 2 to 700 kilowatts (3 to 1,000 horsepower). There are also high-power chipper models mounted on trucks and powered by a separate engine. These models usually also have a hydraulic winch.

Tree chippers are typically made of a hopper with a collar, the chipper mechanism itself, and an optional collection bin for the chips. A tree limb is inserted into the hopper (the collar serving as a partial safety mechanism to keep human body parts away from the chipping blades) and started into the chipping mechanism. The chips exit through a chute and can be directed into a truck-mounted container or onto the ground. Typical output is chips on the order of 2.5–5 cm (1–2 in) across in size. The resulting wood chips have various usages such as being spread as a ground cover or being fed into a digester during papermaking.

Most woodchippers rely on energy stored in a heavy flywheel to do their work (although some use drums). The chipping blades are mounted on the face of the flywheel, and the flywheel is accelerated by an electric motor or internal combustion engine.

Large woodchippers are frequently equipped with grooved rollers in the throats of their feed funnels. Once a branch has been gripped by the rollers, the rollers transport the branch to the chipping blades at a steady rate. These rollers are a safety feature and are generally reversible for situations where a branch gets caught on clothing.

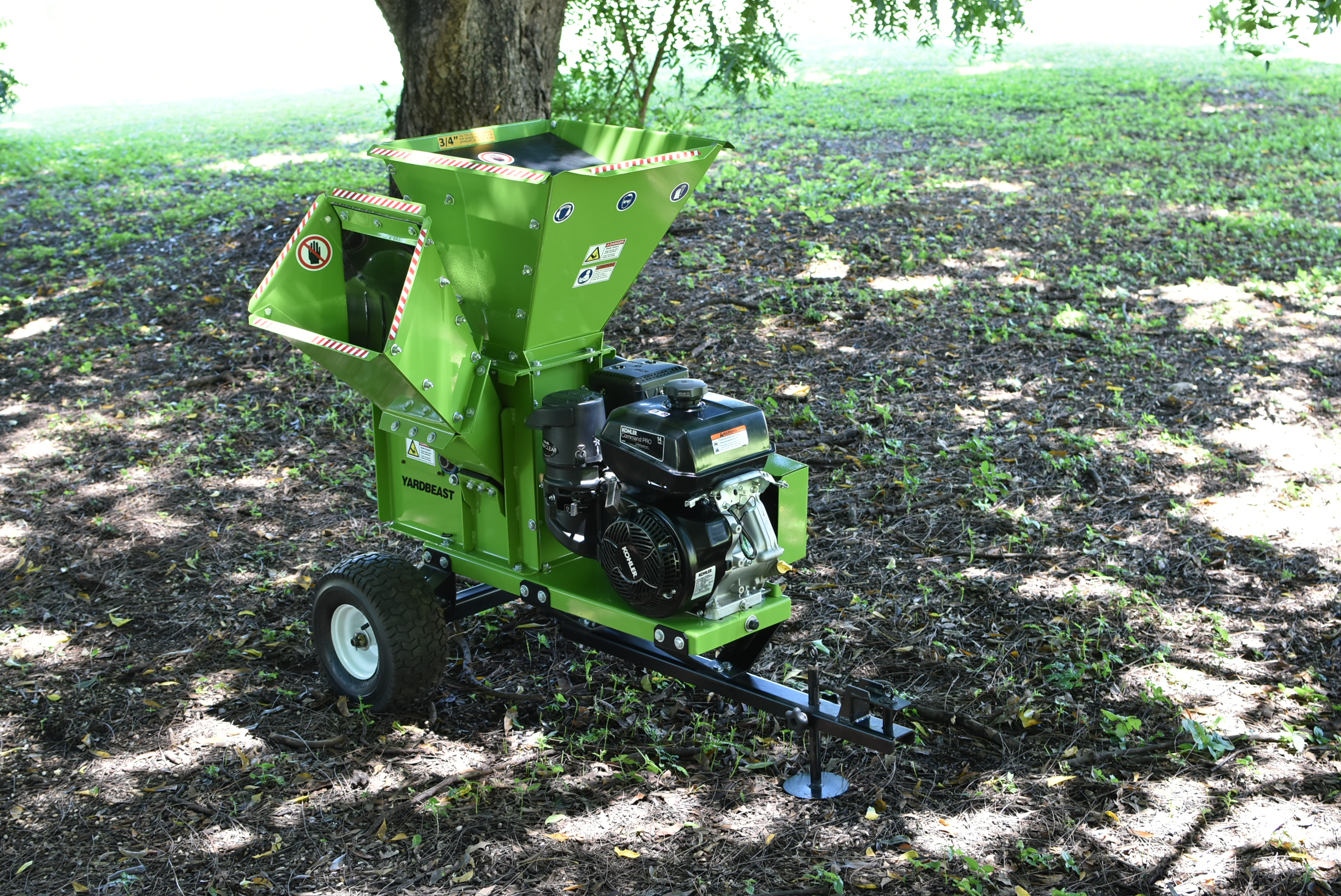
A Yardbeast 2090, showing a chipper shredder configuration. It is distinguished by two dedicated feed hoppers, for chipping and shredding. This type of machine uses a disk rotor with one or more blades and a cluster of hammers and flails to reduce the size of the material.

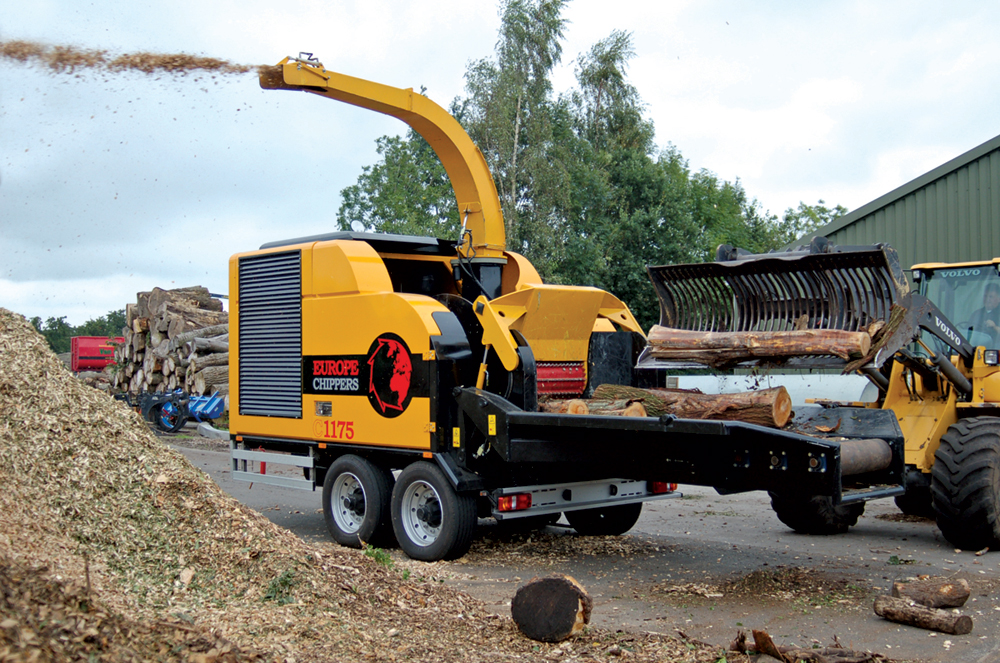
This type of machine is used to chip large pieces of wood.

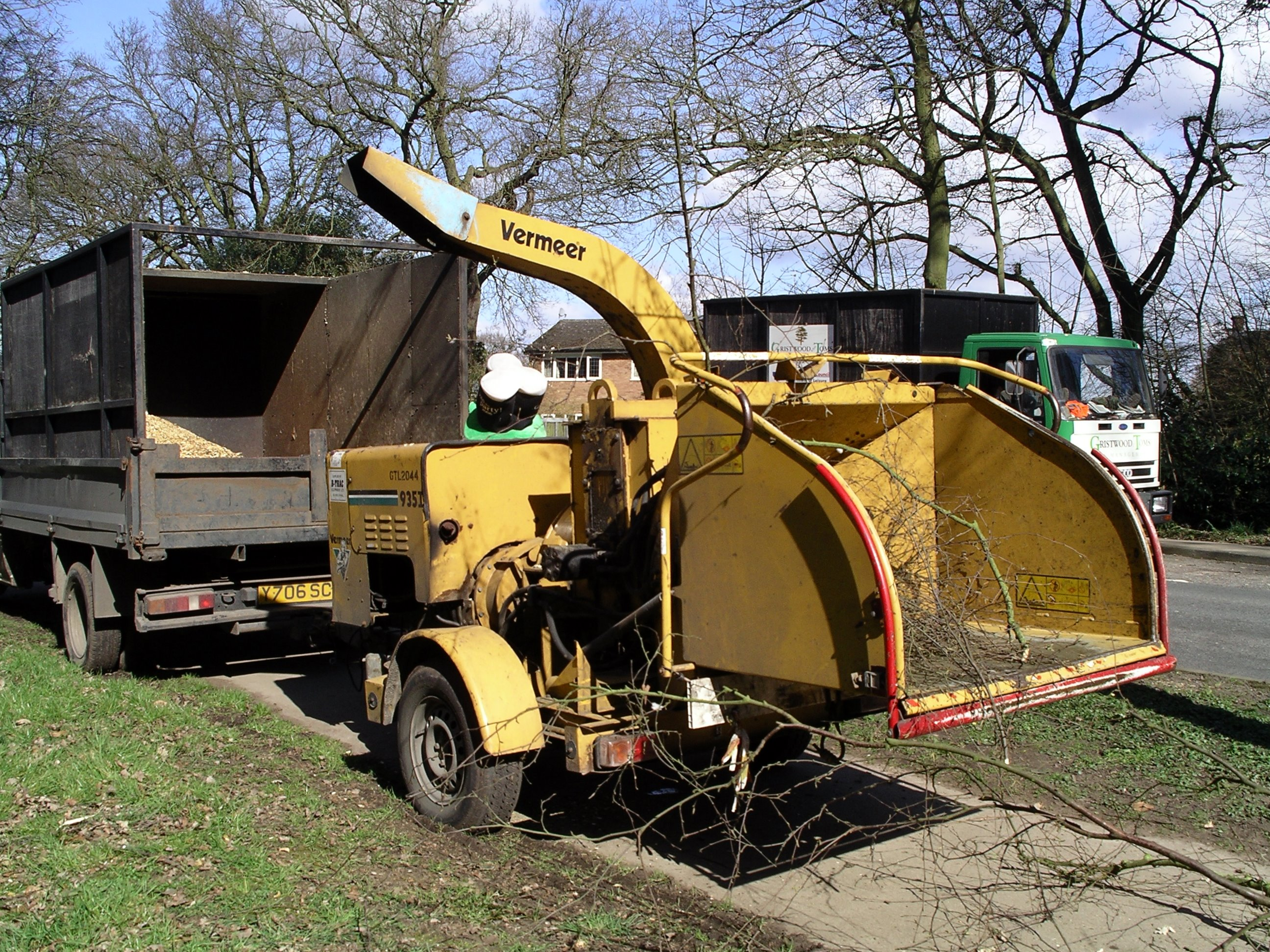
A portable woodchipper and truck with wood chips collected in the truck bed.

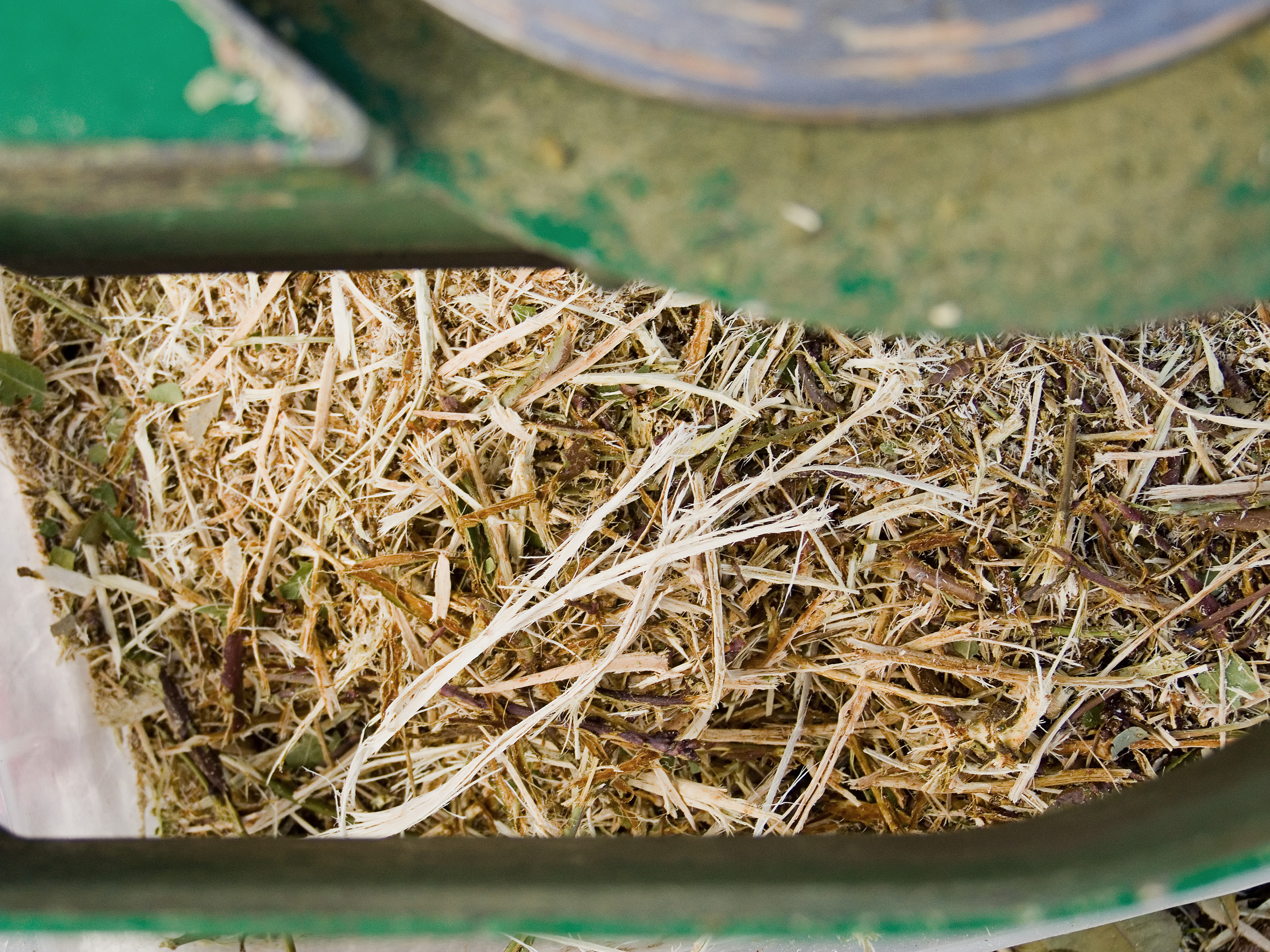
Wood chips from a small garden chipper.

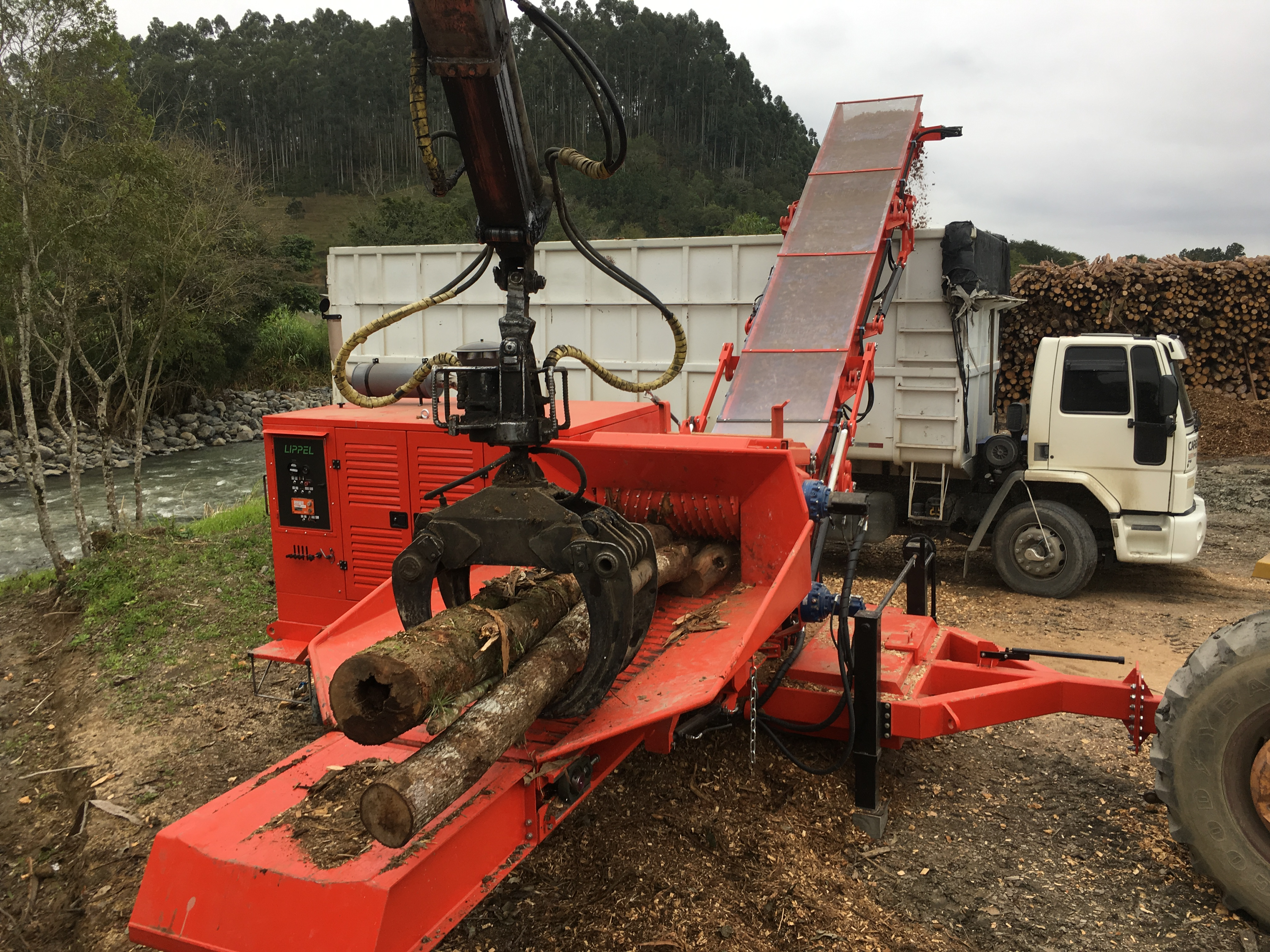
Tree chipper mounted by side to tree processing into biofuel

== History ==
The woodchipper was invented by Peter Jensen (Maasbüll, Germany) in 1884; the "Marke Angeln" soon became the core business of his company, which already produced and repaired communal- and woodworking-machinery.

== Types ==
=== Disc ===
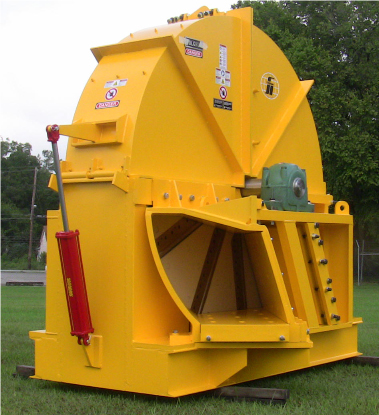
Fulghum Industries 240 cm (96 in) 10K CCW Chipper

The original chipper design employs a steel disk with blades mounted upon it as the chipping mechanism. This technology dates back to an invention by German Heinrich Wigger, for which he obtained a patent in 1922. In this design, (usually) reversible hydraulically powered wheels draw the material from the hopper towards the disk, which is mounted perpendicularly to the incoming material. As the disk is turned by a motor, the blades mounted on the face of the disk cut the material into chips. These are thrown out the chute by flanges on the edges of the disk.

Commercial-grade disk-style chippers usually have a material diameter capacity of 15 to 45 cm (6 to 18 in). Industrial-grade chippers (tub grinders) are available with discs as large as 4 m (160 in) in diameter, requiring 3,000 to 3,700 kW (4,000 to 5,000 hp). One application of industrial disk chippers is to produce the wood chips used in the manufacture of particle board.

=== Drum ===
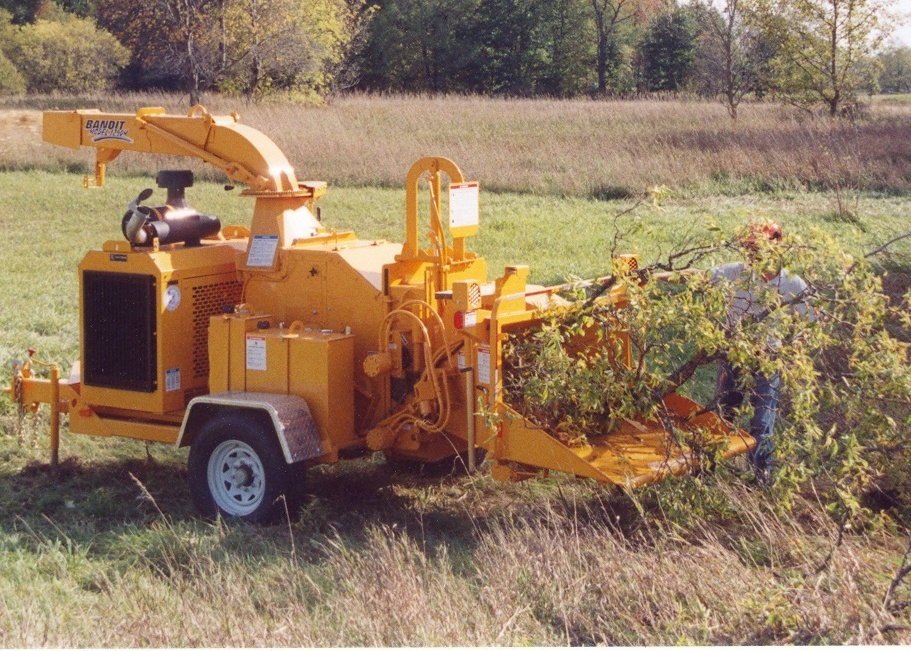
A modern conventional-style drum chipper "Bandit Industries Model 1290H"

Drum chippers employ mechanisms consisting of a large steel drum powered by a motor. The drum is mounted parallel to the hopper and spins toward the chute. Blades mounted to the outer surface of the drum cut the material into chips and propel the chips into the discharge chute. Commercial-grade drum-style chippers usually have a material diameter capacity of 25 to 60 cm (9 to 24 in).

Conventionally-fed drum chippers use the drum as the feed mechanism, drawing the material through as it chips it. These are colloquially known as "chuck-and-duck" chippers, due to the immediate speed attained by material dropped into the drum. Chippers of this type have many drawbacks and safety issues. If an operator becomes snagged on material being fed into the machine, injury or death is very likely. Hydraulically-fed drum chippers have largely replaced conventionally-fed machines. These chippers use a set of hydraulically powered wheels to regulate the rate of feed of material into the chipper drum.

=== Other ===
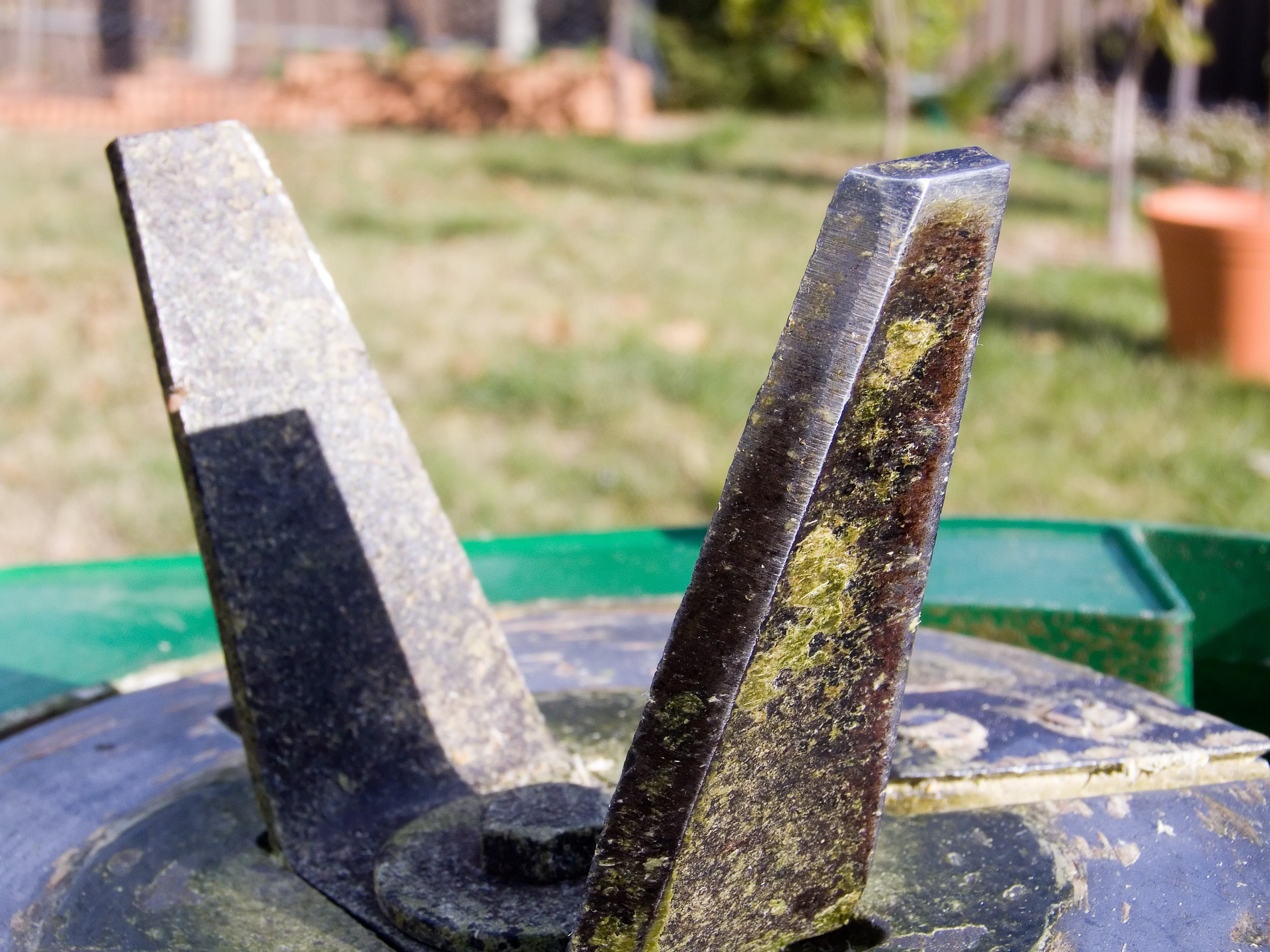
The cutting blades of a small electric chipper. The blades can be removed, by loosening the bolt in the center, to facilitate sharpening or for replacement.

Much larger machines for wood processing exist. "Whole-tree chippers" and "recyclers", which can typically handle material diameters of 60–180 cm (2–6 ft), may employ drums, disks, or a combination of both. The largest machines used in wood processing, often called "tub or horizontal grinders", may handle a material diameter of 2.4 m (8 ft) or greater, and use carbide-tipped flail hammers to pulverize wood rather than cut it, producing a shredded wood rather than chip or chunk. These machines usually have a power of 150–750 kW (200–1,000 hp). Most are so heavy that they require a semi-trailer truck to be transported. Smaller models can be towed by a medium-duty truck.

== Blades ==
Although chippers vary greatly in size, type, and capacity, the blades processing the wood are similar in construction. They are rectangular in shape and are usually 4–10 cm (1 1/2–4 in) across by 15–30 cm (6–12 in) long. They vary in thickness from about 4–5 cm (1 1/2–2 in). Chipper blades are made from high-grade steel and usually contain a minimum of 8% chromium for hardness.

== City services ==
Fallen branches, especially when it is suspected that they are infested by beetles or their larvae, are chipped to prevent further infestation. City governments acquire and operate chippers as needed, including for seasonal use.

== Safety ==
Thirty-one people were killed in woodchipper accidents between 1992 and 2002 in the US, according to a 2005 report by the Journal of the American Medical Association.

== In popular culture ==
Joel and Ethan Coen's film Fargo features an infamous scene in which Peter Stormare, as Gaear Grimsrud, feeds the remains of Steve Buscemi's character, Carl Showalter, into a woodchipper. The scene, according to the film's special edition DVD, was based on the 1986 murder of Helle Crafts. The woodchipper used in the scene is now a tourist attraction at the Fargo-Moorhead Visitors Center.

It was claimed that Saddam Hussein used chippers to murder dissident citizens of his country, although there was extremely little evidence to support this claim.

Horror films Tucker and Dale vs. Evil (2011) and Winnie-the-Pooh: Blood and Honey (2023) contain scenes depicting the use of a woodchipper as a murder weapon.

== See also ==
- Forestry mulching
- Industrial shredder
- Ramial chipped wood
- Tree baler
