= Great Walk Networking =

Bushwalking community in Western Australia

- Founded: 1988
- Type: Conservation
- Purpose: Community building, conservation and the environment.
- Location: Western Australia
- Origins: The Great Walk, a 650 km supported bushwalk to raise awareness of logging old-growth forests in 1988.
- Method: Studies have shown people tend to act to protect the environment when they spend time in areas of environmental significance. Great Walk Networking offers opportunities for people of all ages to visit, walk and live in such areas throughout Western Australia, two to four times a year for approximately ten days. During this time, the Walk forms a travelling and self-supporting bushwalking community with a focus on environmental issues.
- Revenue: Primarily self-supporting with occasional grants.
- Endowment: Great Walk Networking was bequeathed a block of land near Nannup, Western Australia by John Thomson, a renowned forester and conservationist.
- Website: greatwalknetwork.org

Great Walk Networking, also known as Great Walk Network, is a bushwalking community in Western Australia. The Great Walk started in 1988 as a protest walk from Denmark to Parliament House in Perth, to raise awareness of logging in Western Australia's old growth forests.

The organisation of the first Walk was also an Australian Bicentenary celebration to appreciate the environment of Southwest Australia, which is home to a relatively small but unique tall forest heritage: the world's only Eucalyptus marginata (jarrah), E. diversicolor (karri), E. jacksonii (Tingle), E. wandoo subsp. wandoo (Wandoo), E. patens (blackbutt) and E. gomphocephala (tuart) forests grow there.

Since 1988, different people have organized walks a few times each year. Most Walks are still organized with a focus on raising awareness of conservation and land use issues. Great Walk Networking is a non-profit voluntary organization.

== History ==
=== The Conservation Movement in Western Australia, 1970s – 1980s ===
The Western Australian forests have been extensively challenged by significant threats: earlier destruction due to settlement patterns and later clearfelling for woodchipping, mining for mineral sands and bauxite, as well as forestry practices that showed little interest in long term sustainability.

Many of the Great Walk Networking participants had been involved with other organisations that formed before 1988 to address significant threats to South Western forests of Western Australia. As early as the mid 1970s the Campaign to Save Native Forests (CSNF) and South West Forests Defence Foundation (SWFDF) had been seeking to address the forestry and mining proposals for woodchipping and mining in the forests. The Manjimup wood chip proposals of 1976–1977, and the Wagerup mining proposals in the Darling Range consumed the energies of the CSNF and the SWFDF, as well as other groups based either at the Environment Centre of Western Australia or associated with the Conservation Council of Western Australia. As the older groups changed due to resolution of some of the issues - subsequent groups like Great Walk Networking absorbed members from the earlier groups.

=== The Great Walk (20 March – 14 April 1988) ===
On 20 March 1988, 200 people set out from Denmark, on Western Australia's south coast, to walk through the forests of the State's south west on a 650 kilometre trek north to Perth.

The Great Walk was launched with an Aboriginal dance ceremony to "protect the walkers, and attune them to the country through which they would travel." Over the next 26 days, over 1000 people would take part, ostensibly to express their appreciation and concerns for the environment. These expressions were felt to be conveyed by a document called the Great Walk Tree Charter, which was carried to Parliament House where it was presented to the Premier of Western Australia, Peter Dowding.

The Great Walk required a great deal of planning and coordination: the route had to mapped, checked and marked on the ground, support crews and equipment assembled, transport arranged, child-care, first aid and medical personnel coordinated and a mobile catering system put together, able to serve 200-500 people at a time. For the most part, sections of the Walk were co-ordinated 'tag-team' style, with new coordination teams assembled for sections of the Walk. During the 26 days from March to April 1988, the Great Walk formed an entirely self-supporting, mobile community of 200 to 500 people that supported itself on A$5 contributions from participating walkers per day.

=== Bambooroo ===
Bambooroo was a magazine published by Great Walk Networking from May 1988 to May 1990. Its focus was on environmental issues of concern primarily to the South West region of Western Australia. Bambooroo means "message stick" or "message bearer" in the Nyoongah language.

During the first Great Walk, a bambooroo was presented to the Walkers at a corroborree held in Kirup, Western Australia. Ken Colbung described the bambooroo to the Walkers and supporters who collected at Parliament House on 20 April 1988 as a "spiritual message stick" that "protected (the Walkers) from the weather." He later said a message stick "has a very special spiritual significance for the messenger, and when we dedicated it at Kirup it then took all the hopes and realisations of the people present that they would have a walk that would not be caught up in the elements, so that rain would not flood them out or that mud would not be there, that the winds would not be too strong, but the elements would be very controlled and it'd allow the Walkers a peaceful walk up to Perth."

== Other media ==
The Great Walk: The documentary of an historic environmental statement in WA - The Great Walk from Denmark to Perth, 20 March - 15 April 1988. (1989) Documentary. Directed by Noeleen Harrison. Film and Television Institute, funded by Great Walk Networking.
