= Tree baler =

Machine for transporting trees

A tree baler is a machine that wraps trees to allow for easier shipment and storage. Wrapped trees take up much less space and are less likely to be damaged during shipment. The aim of the device is to replace work that previously required hand-tying individual trees, most often used at commercial nurseries.

Tree balers use a funnel, through which the tree is forced, thereby compressing the branches tight to the trunk. The baler then wraps or ties the branches to maintain a compressed shape for shipment and storage. Simple machines are operated manually, usually requiring one person to push the tree through the funnel and another to wrap it. A mechanized baler does both operations and can bale over 100 trees per hour.

According to the Berks-Mont News, the motorized christmas tree baler was invented in Pennsylvania in 1944.

A manual baler may also keep the branches compressed by encasing the tree in a plastic netting, rather than wrapping them with twine. This type of baler is often used in retail sales of christmas trees to package the tree for transport by the customer. Manual balers do not compress trees as tightly as mechanized ones.

Tree baler photos (courtesy of Dutchman Industries)

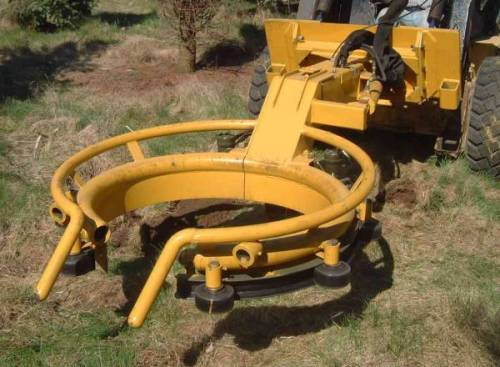
Close-up view of a tree baler

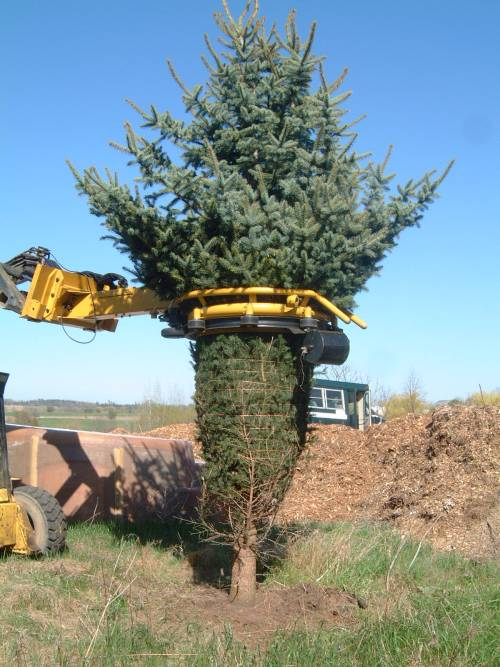
A tree baler in action

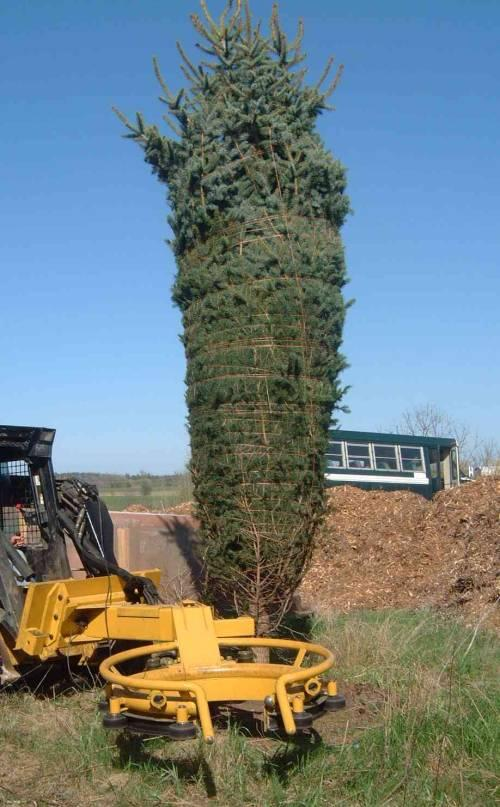
Tyer next to a wrapped tree
