= South Western Times =

Weekly newspaper in Western Australia

- Type: weekly
- Owner: Seven West Media
- Founded: 1888
- City: Bunbury
- Country: Australia

The South Western Times is a weekly English language newspaper published for Bunbury and the South West region in Western Australia.

The newspaper was first published in 1888 and was originally titled the Southern Advertiser. The name was changed later the same year to the Southern Times and in 1917 it became the South Western Times.

The newspaper also published an annual state pictorial feature with a goal of promoting the South-West, the South Western Times Illustrated Annual. The 1947 issue featured scenes of the Pemberton pool's carnival day, forestry and other industries. The 1952 issue had prints of views in Collie and Denmark, content on cows, schools and fire controls.

The distribution area includes many towns in the South West, including Bunbury, Boyanup, Capel, Donnybrook, Collie, Harvey, Balingup and Darkan. The paper is published every Thursday and in 2019 has a circulation of 6,300 and a readership of 19,000.

== Title history ==
Title	Dates	Volumes	Notes
Southern Advertiser	1888	Vol. 1, no. 1 (3 January 1888) - v. 1, no. 33 (14 August 1888)	
Southern Times	1888-1916	Vol. 1, no. 1 (28 August 1888) - v. 29, no. 52 (30 December 1916)	
South Western Times	1917-1929	Vol. 1, no. 1 (4 January 1917) - v. 12, no. 154 (31 December 1929)	Issues from 1917 to 1929 have been digitised and made available on Trove.
South Western Tribune	1930-1932	Vol. 1, no. 1 (4 January 1930) - v. 3, no. 8 (30 January 1932)	Merged with Bunbury herald and Blackwood express, to become: South Western Tribune.
South Western Times	1932-current	Vol. 3, no. 9 (3 February 1932)-current	Issues from 1932 to 1954 have been digitised and made available on Trove.

== See also ==
- List of newspapers in Australia
- List of newspapers in Western Australia
