= Save Our Marine Life =

- Founded: 2008
- Purpose: Conservation
- Location: Perth, Western Australia, Australia
- Region served: Australia
- Method: Lobbying, Research, Activism
- Website: Save Our Marine Life official website

Save Our Marine Life (SOML) is an Australian not-for-profit, non-governmental environmental advocacy alliance working to protect and secure Australia's marine life. It is a collaboration of 29 non-profit conservation organisations, both Australian and international. SOML was initially founded in 2008 to raise awareness of the need for the Australian Government to establish a network of large marine sanctuaries in the country's South West marine region. In 2010 SOML became a national campaign in order to drive the completion of Australia's National Network of Marine Parks.

As a result of the SOML campaign and the long-standing Australian Government NRSMPA program (National Representative System of Marine Protected Areas) in 2012 the Gillard Labor Government declared 44 new federal marine parks in the South-west, North-west, North, Coral Sea and Temperate East marine regions, bringing Australia's federal marine park total to 60, covering a total area of 3.3million square kilometers (36% of Australia's Exclusive Economic Zone (EEZ)) - the largest marine parks network in the world.

In December 2013 the incoming Abbott Coalition Government suspended the operation of the 44 new parks before they could commence operation (which was scheduled for July 2014), and commenced an independent review. That review provided its findings to the then Federal Environment Minister Greg Hunt in December 2015. The findings were released to the public in September 2016. Whilst endorsing the process undertaken by previous governments to develop the 44 marine parks, the Review recommended changes to zoning in a number of the new parks.

In September 2016 the Turnbull Coalition Government commenced a further public consultation process to develop new management plans for the marine parks in order to change the zoning. In March 2018 the revised management plans were tabled in the Australian Parliament for consideration. Changes to the original 2012 zoning in the parks included removal of almost half the high level protective green ‘sanctuary’ zoning across the network - an area almost twice the size of the state of Victoria and equivalent in area to the loss of half of Australia's national parks on land - the biggest single windback of conservation area in Australia's history.

The alliance groups include:

- Australian Conservation Foundation
- Australian Marine Conservation Society
- Conservation Council of Western Australia
- Cairns and Far North Environment Centre
- Conservation Council of WA
- Conservation Council of South Australia
- Environment Centre of the Northern Territory
- Environment Tasmania
- Environment Victoria
- Environs Kimberley
- Greenpeace Asia Pacific
- Humane Society International
- International Fund for Animal Welfare
- National Parks Association of NSW
- National Parks Association of Qld
- Nature Conservation Council of NSW
- North Queensland Conservation Council
- Queensland Conservation Council
- Project AWARE Foundation
- Sealife Trust
- Sea Shepherd
- Surfrider
- The Nature Conservancy
- The Pew Charitable Trusts
- The Wilderness Society
- Victorian National Parks Association
- Whale and Dolphin Conservation Society
- Wildlife Preservation Council of Qld
- World Wildlife Fund – Australia

The creation of the national network crossed political divides and received bi-partisan political support. It was initiated by John Howard's Coalition Government in 1998, and finalised by the federal Labor Government in 2012. In 2014 the Abbott Coalition Government suspended the parks from operation pending a review.

On 1 July 2018 the 44 federal/Commonwealth waters parks created in 2012 commenced operation with revised zoning amidst great concern at the loss of almost half the highly protective green zoning.
