= Industrial shredder =

Machine used for reducing the size of material

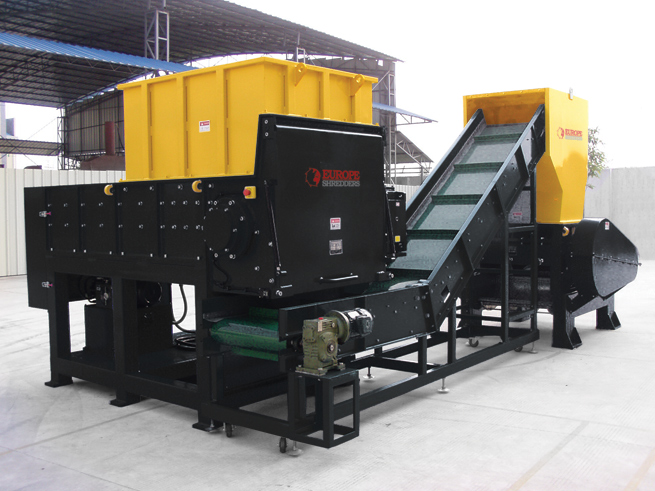
Industrial shredder. This shredder is set up in line with a granulator, in order to reduce the size of the processed material more.

An industrial shredder is a machine used to break down materials for various applications such as recycling, volume reduction, and product destruction. Industrial shredders come in many different sizes and design variations based on what particle size is needed for final shredded product.

The main categories of designs used today are as follows: low speed, high torque shear type shredders of single, dual, triple and quad shaft design, single shaft grinders of single or dual shaft design, granulators, knife hogs, raspers, maulers, flails, crackermills, and refining mills. Industrial shredder components include a rotor, counter blades, housing, motor, transmission system, power system and electrical control system.

Some examples of materials that are commonly shredded are: tires, metals, construction and demolition debris, wood, plastics, leathers, papers and garbage, such as commercial and mixed waste. The industrial shredder is commonly used to process materials into different sizes for separation or to reduce the cost of transport. Waste materials such as municipal solid waste, radioactive waste, medical waste, and hazardous waste are shredded in treatment and disposal systems. Shredders are sometimes used in data centers to securely destroy hard drives, as the data on a shredded drive cannot be realistically recovered.

Because the hardness of materials differs, the blades on shredders are also slightly different.

An industrial shredder is any shredder that can be used in an industrial application (rather than a consumer application). They can be equipped with different types of cutting systems: horizontal shaft design, vertical shaft design, single-shaft, two-shaft, three-shaft and four-shaft cutting systems. These shredders are slow speed or high speed, and are not restricted in being classified as an industrial shredder by their speed or horsepower. Small, low-cost portable shredders have been developed; these are often suitable for personal use as well as for small scale industry.

The largest scrap metal shredder in the world was designed with 7,355 kW by Schnitzer Steel Industries (now Radius Recycling) of Portland, Oregon in 1980. The 9,200 hp (6,860 kW) Lynxs at the Sims Metal Management plant at the mouth of the River Usk in Newport, Wales has access by road, rail and sea. It can process 450 cars per hour.

== See also ==
- Ramial chipped wood
