= Conservation Council of Western Australia =

Australian conservation group

The Conservation Council of Western Australia is the umbrella body for conservation groups and organisations in Western Australia. It has been the co-ordinator, publisher and guiding body for issues of woodchipping in the South West of Western Australia, the logging of old growth forests, as well as providing input into government processes involved with all aspects of environmental protection and conservation.

Its origins were closely related to the Perth-based - Environment Centre of W.A., and the development and success of the environmental movement also saw subsequent development of the regional environment centres in Denmark, Albany, Margaret River and Busselton.

In 1981 the council was involved in a class action in the United States against bauxite miners Reynolds and Alcoa. regarding mining in the jarrah forests of the Darling Range east of Perth; the complaint was lodged with the U.S. Federal District Court in Pittsburgh, Pennsylvania.^{a} ^{b}

Notable member groups of the council have included the Campaign to Save Native Forests, South West Forests Defence Foundation, West Australian Forest Alliance, and Great Walk Networking. Smaller, more transient single-purpose protest groups have found the council a positive custodian and advocate over the thirty years of its activities. Some groups are no longer current but their impact on the process of conservation and preservation in Western Australia have been significant in raising public awareness of issues.

== Affiliated groups ==
(This list may not be correct - some groups might be inactive - and other active groups may be not listed...) (In alphabetical order...)

- Active Community Environmentalists
- Albany Community Environment Centre Inc
- Alumina Action Alliance
- Animal Rights Advocates
- Australian Association of Bush Regenerators (WA)
- Australian Marine Conservation Society
- Avon Valley Environmental Society
- Balingup Friends of the Forest Inc.
- Bassendean Preservation Group Inc
- Birds Australia WA Group
- Blackwood Environment Society
- Bridgetown-Greenbushes Friends of the Forest
- Bushwalkers of WA
- Busselton-Dunsborough Environment Centre
- Canning River Residents Environment Protection Association
- Cape Conservation Group
- Cape to Cape Alliance
- Care for Hedland Environmental Association
- Coogee Coastal Action Coalition
- Darling Range Wildlife Shelter
- Denmark Conservation Society
- Denmark Environment Centre
- EARTH
- Environmental Defenders Office WA
- Environment House
- Environmental Weeds Action Network (WA)
- Environs Kimberley
- FAWNA Inc.
- Foothills Save Our Trees Action Group
- Friends of Bold Park Bushland Inc.
- Friends of Moore River Estuary
- Friends of the Fitzgerald River National Park
- Friends of Star Swamp Bushland Inc
- Geographic Society of WA Inc.
- Guilderton Community Association
- Lake Meelup Preservation Society
- Leeuwin Environment
- Leighton Action Coalition
- Local Environmental Action Forum (LEAF)
- Malleefowl Preservation Group
- Margaret River Regional Environment Centre
- Men of the Trees
- Naragebup Rockingham Regional Environment Centre
- Nature and Agriculture Rehabilitation Association (NARA)
- Nature Reserves Preservation Group
- Oxfam (WA Branch)
- Peel Preservation Group
- People for Nuclear Disarmament
- Perth Bushwalkers Club
- Pilbara Wildlife Carers Association
- Pollution Action Network
- Port Kennedy LCDC
- Quinns Rocks Environmental Group Inc
- Roleystone Dieback Action Group
- Save Endangered East Kimberley Species Group Inc.
- Save Our Marine Life
- South West Environment Centre
- South-West Forest Defence Foundation Inc.
- Sustainable Energy Now, Inc.
- Sustainable Population Australia Inc. WA Branch
- Sustainable Transport Coalition
- The River Conservation Society
- The Rottnest Society
- Urban Bushland Council (WA)
- Vive La Recherche
- WA Native Orchid Study & Conservation Group
- WA Speleological Group (WASG)
- Walpole-Nornalup National Park Association
- Waterbird Conservation Group Inc.
- Western Australian Naturalists' Club
- Wetlands Conservation Society
- Wilderness Society WA
- Wildflower Society of Western Australia
- Yamatji Land and Sea Council
- Yarloop and Districts Concerned Residents Committee
- Youth Environment Scheme

== Community incentive ==
The council created the Bessie Rischbieth Conservation Award to acknowledge the contribution of a volunteer in the community conservation sector in 1994.

== See also ==
- Conservation Council of South Australia
- Environment Victoria
- Queensland Conservation Council
- Woodchipping

== Notes ==
a:.Jarrah class action legal complaint: the Conservation Council of Western Australia Inc. (Plaintiffs) - v. - Aluminium Company of America (ALCOA) and Reynolds Metals Co., (Defendants), Feb. 1981. [Perth, W.A.] : Conservation Council of W.A, 1981.

b:.Conservation Council, Etc. v. Aluminum Co., Etc. 518 F. Supp. 270 (W.D. Pa. 1981). Casetext, 9 July 1981. Retrieved 19 October 2022.
