= Ramial chipped wood =

Woodchips made from small- to medium-sized branches

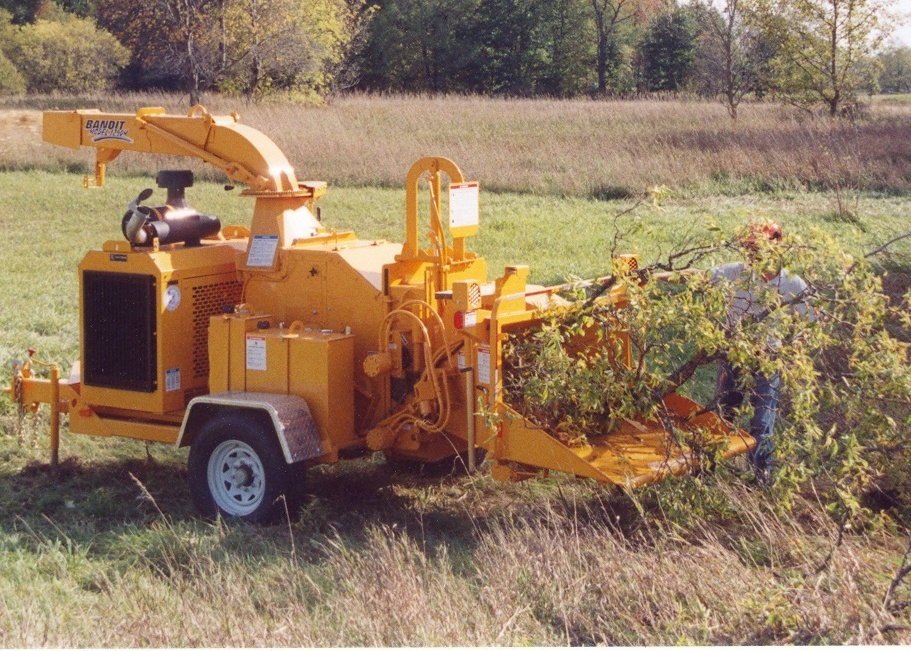

Ramial chipped wood (RCW), also called BRF (from the French name, bois raméal fragmenté, 'chipped branch-wood'), is a type of woodchips made solely from small to medium-sized branches. The adjective "ramial" refers to branches (rami). RCW is a forest product used in agriculture for mulching and soil enrichment. It may be laid on top of the soil (as in mulching), mixed into it (as a green manure), or composted first and then applied.

RCW consists of the twigs and branches of trees and woody shrubs, preferably deciduous, including small limbs up to 7 cm (just under 3 inches) in diameter. It is processed into small pieces by chipping, and the resulting product has a relatively high ratio of cambium to cellulose compared to other chipped wood products. Thus, it is higher in nutrients and is an effective promoter of the growth of soil fungi and of soil-building in general. The goal is to develop an airy and spongy soil that holds an ideal amount of water and resists evaporation and compaction, while containing a long-term source of fertility. It can effectively serve as a panacea for depleted and eroded soils.

The raw material is primarily a byproduct of the hardwood logging industry, where it was traditionally regarded as a waste material. Research into forest soils and ecosystems at Laval University (Quebec, Canada) led to the recognition of the value of this material and to research into its uses.

The use of willow RCW mulch on mine waste rock can promote the spontaneous colonization of boreal tree seedlings. Moreover, the addition of RCW promotes bacterial diversity, particularly in the rhizosphere of pioneer trees and on waste rock substrates. It stimulates the development of microbial groups beneficial to plant growth, although its effect on fungal diversity is more variable. On heavily disturbed soils, particularly in boreal regions, RCW can thus play a key role in ecological restoration by facilitating the establishment of microbial and plant communities.

== Usable types of wood ==
The wood from heartwood and branches larger than 3 inches in diameter is not desirable due to its high C/N (carbon to nitrogen) ratio (averaging 600:1), which then requires additional nitrogen for decomposition. Only the sapwood and young branches from the various noble hardwoods (such as oak, chestnut, maple, beech, and acacia) are used because the heartwood in larger branches is high in tannin.

Because of their specific lignin, conifers may be used only in combination with deciduous RCW, and in no greater ratio than 10 to 20%. Conifer resin has no aggradation character because it consists of derivatives of diterpenes (resin part) and monoterpenes (part turpentine). Note that only the genera Pinus, Picea, Larix and Pseudotsuga have resin canals. The cedars are characterized by their constituents of the heartwood toxic to microorganisms, tropolone derivatives (thujaplicines) phenolic nature, and are therefore to be avoided in the production of ramial chipped wood.

The acidification of soils by RCW has not been observed. In contrast, acidic soils tend to have their pH raised by RCW applications.

While some species, such as black locust and black walnut, bear heartwood containing resins that make them resistant to rot; in practice their RCW decomposes well on a moist soil. Even Larix, which resists decomposition and is also a conifer, promoted successful forest regeneration in Quebec and was found to be the best of the conifer for use in RCW (even better than some hardwoods).

== Composition of RCW ==
Because they are the most exposed part of the tree to the light, and the most actively growing, young branches (and young trees) used in RCW are from the richest parts of the trees. They contain 75% of the minerals, amino acids, proteins, phytohormones and biological catalysts (enzymes) found in the tree.

== See also ==
- Industrial shredder
- Woodchipper
