= Campaign to Save Native Forests =

Former Western Australian conservation organisation

The Campaign to Save Native Forests (W.A.) (CSNF) was the name of a grassroots organisation which grew from a campaign started in Perth, Western Australia, in 1975, as a response to the development of a woodchipping industry in the south-west jarrah and karri forests of Western Australia. The Manjimup woodchip project aroused significant levels of protest in Perth and the South West region out of public concern that inadequate measures had been made for conservation alongside exploitation of the south west hardwood forests.

The public figures and faces of the CSNF at the time—Beth Schulz, Basil Schur, and Neil Bartholomaeus—each gained extensive coverage on the local media during public rallies at Wagerup and elsewhere.

At the times that the CSNF tried to cope with the issues of governmental and forestry business pressures to develop woodchipping, and mining in the jarrah forest, another group started as well—the South West Forests Defence Foundation. There was co-operation between the groups on some issues as well as joint publications.

The CSNF subsequently campaigned in response to mining by Alcoa in the jarrah forest on the Darling Scarp, conducting rallies and protests outside the alumina refinery construction site at Wagerup in February, May, and August 1979. It was involved in submissions to Australian federal and Western Australian state inquiries on forestry through the late 1980s.

Many members of CSNF went on to become involved in other groups and associations, such as West Australian Forest Alliance, Great Walk Networking, and other groups usually associated with the Conservation Council of Western Australia. Many of these groups did not gain the extensive national attention and subsequent political ramifications that, for example, the Tasmanian Wilderness Society did with its early 1980s No Dams campaign for the Franklin River, which influenced Tasmanian domestic politics for a decade. However, they did have coverage in local media for their particular issues, and despite the lack of national attention they had marked impact on the ways that all levels of government proceeded with environmentally problematic issues.

== Journal ==
C.S.N.F. news. Perth [W.A.] : Campaign to Save Native Forests. July 1978-April 1991

== Publications (chronologically) ==
(Excludes posters)

- Campaign to Save Native Forests (W.A.) (1975) The threat to the forests : a submission to the Australian Senate Standing Committee on the (sic) Social Environment concerning the impending Manjimup wood-chip project.
- Tingay, Susan and Alan Tingay (1976) Eucalypts of the Perth area Perth : Campaign to Save Native Forests (W.A.)
- Robert Powell & Jane Emberson (1978) An old look at trees : vegetation of south-western Australia in old photographs Perth, W.A.: Campaign to Save Native Forests (W.A.). ISBN 0-9597449-3-2
- Campaign to Save Native Forests (W.A.) [Submission] (1978) : Commenting on ERMP-draft environmental impact statement of ALCOA of Australia, regarding the proposed bauxite alumina project at Wagerup, W.A.
- Conservation Council of WA et al. (1982) Karri at the crossroads : a proposal for the adequate conservation of the remaining karri forest in Western Australia and the creation of the Shannon Karri National Park Nedlands, W.A. ISBN 0-9593391-0-8, also with

Redirection of the karri forest economy prepared by Conservation Council of W.A. (Inc.), South-West Forests Defence Foundation, Campaign to Save Native Forests (W.A.)

- Capill, L. G. (1984) Wandoo woodland conservation : a proposal for a system of ecological reserves in the woodlands of southwestern Australia Perth, [W.A.] : Campaign to Save Native Forests (W.A.)
- Meney, Kathy and Brown, P. (1985) Forests on foot : 40 walks in the forests of the south west of Western Australia South Perth, W.A.: Campaign to Save Native Forests. ISBN 0-9589269-0-5
- Paterson, Suzanne.(1985) Forests of Western Australia : ecology and conservation / prepared by Suzanne Paterson for Campaign to Save Native Forests (W.A.). Perth : Campaign to Save Native Forests (W.A.).ISBN 0959744983
- Schur, Basil. (1985) Jarrah forest or bauxite dollars? : a critique of bauxite mine rehabilitation in the jarrah forests of southwestern Australia Perth [W.A.] : Campaign to Save Native Forests (W.A.). ISBN 0-9597449-7-5
- Campaign to Save Native Forests, (1987) Time for change : proposals for conservation and improved management in the forests of south-western Australia Campaign to Save Native Forests ... [et al.]. Perth [W.A.] : . ISBN 0-9589269-1-3
- Campaign to Save Native Forests ... [et al.] (1987) A question of balance : a submission on the draft regional management plans and the draft timber strategy of the Department of Conservation and Land Management Perth [W.A.] : Campaign to Save Native Forests.
- Campaign to Save Native Forests [et al.] (1988) The Land is our future : rehabilitation of the Denmark River Catchment Denmark, W.A : Denmark Environment Centre. ISBN 0-9589269-2-1

== Archive ==
- Campaign to Save Native Forests (W.A.) Files, 1975-1992 [manuscript]. Battye Library MN 1432, Records of the Campaign to Save Native Forests, ACC 4543A. The Campaign to Save Native Forests (WA) was launched in February 1975, initially to fight the impending destruction of the karri forest by the Manjimup Woodchip Project and its associated clear-felling programme. From involvement with this problem there quickly emerged an awareness of the great complexity and seriousness of the conservation needs of WA's native forests. Includes files on organisation, campaigning, conservation philosophy, trees, forests, logging, timber, woodchipping native forests, burning, forest disease, remnant vegetation, land clearing, salinity, jarrah class action, heritage, reserves and parks, Shannon campaign, jarrah forests, wandoo, pines, specific threatened forest areas (including rainforests), miscellaneous files.
