= South West Forests Defence Foundation =

Conservation organization in Western Australia

South West Forests Defence Foundation Inc. (SFDF) is a group that has been involved in the conservation of the jarrah and karri forests of the South West region of Western Australia for nearly five decades.

It was formed at approximately the same time as the government of Charles Court expressed interest in exploiting forests in the south west for woodchipping. Around the same time, the forests of the Darling Scarp were being allocated for removal for the mining of bauxite. Another group, the Campaign to Save Native Forests, worked in co-operation with the SFDF on publishing critiques of the environmental conditions for the woodchipping at Manjimup. The SFDF continued to take issue with industry and government plans for karri forests on the south coast region, and it was not until the late 1990s that the region was given limited protection from forestry by the creation of national parks and reserves.

== Newsletter ==
- South-West Forests Defence Foundation (W.A.) (1976), Newsletter, The Foundation

== Select publications ==
- South-West Forests Defence Foundation (W.A.) (1975), Summary of arguments against the Manjimup woodchip project, Nedlands, W.A
- South-West Forests Defence Foundation (W.A.); South-West Forests Defence Foundation (W.A.) (1986), Karri forest facts : facts and figures about Western Australia's karri forest, The Foundation, ISBN 978-0-9597517-7-2
- South-West Forests Defence Foundation (W.A.), Prescribed Burning Fact Sheets, August 2024
