= Esk =

Esk or ESK may refer to:

== Places ==
- Esk, Queensland, Australia
- Esk, Saskatchewan, Canada
- Esk Island, in the Great Palm Island group, Queensland, Australia
- River Esk (disambiguation), also Esk River
- Shire of Esk, a former local government area in Queensland, Australia
- Esk Island, one of the Whitsunday Islands, Queensland, Australia
- Upper Esk, Tasmania, a locality in Australia

== Other uses ==
- HMS Esk, several ships
- Mungo ESK, a German Army air-transportable armoured transport vehicle
- Elbe Lateral Canal (German: Elbe-Seitenkanal), in Germany
- Europa-Schule Kairo, a German international school in New Cairo, Egypt
- Esk Highway, Tasmania, Australia
- ESK, IATA code for Eskişehir Airport, Turkey
- esk, ISO 639-3 code for the Northwest Alaska Inupiatun language, spoken in Alaska and the Northwest Territories
- ESK, ICAO airline designator for SkyEurope, a defunct Slovak airline
- Esk, a character of Terry Pratchett's novel Equal Rites

== See also ==
- North Esk (disambiguation)
- South Esk (disambiguation)
