= SGAP =

SGAP may refer to:

- Aminopeptidase S, an enzyme
- Australian Native Plants Society, an Australian federation of organizations dedicated to conservation and cultivation of native plants
