= Scotsdale =

Scotsdale may refer to:

- Scotsdale, Missouri
- Scotsdale, Western Australia

== See also ==
- Scottsdale (disambiguation)
- Scottdale (disambiguation)
