= Barren Grounds Nature Reserve =

Nature reserve of New South Wales, Australia

- IUCN category II (national park)
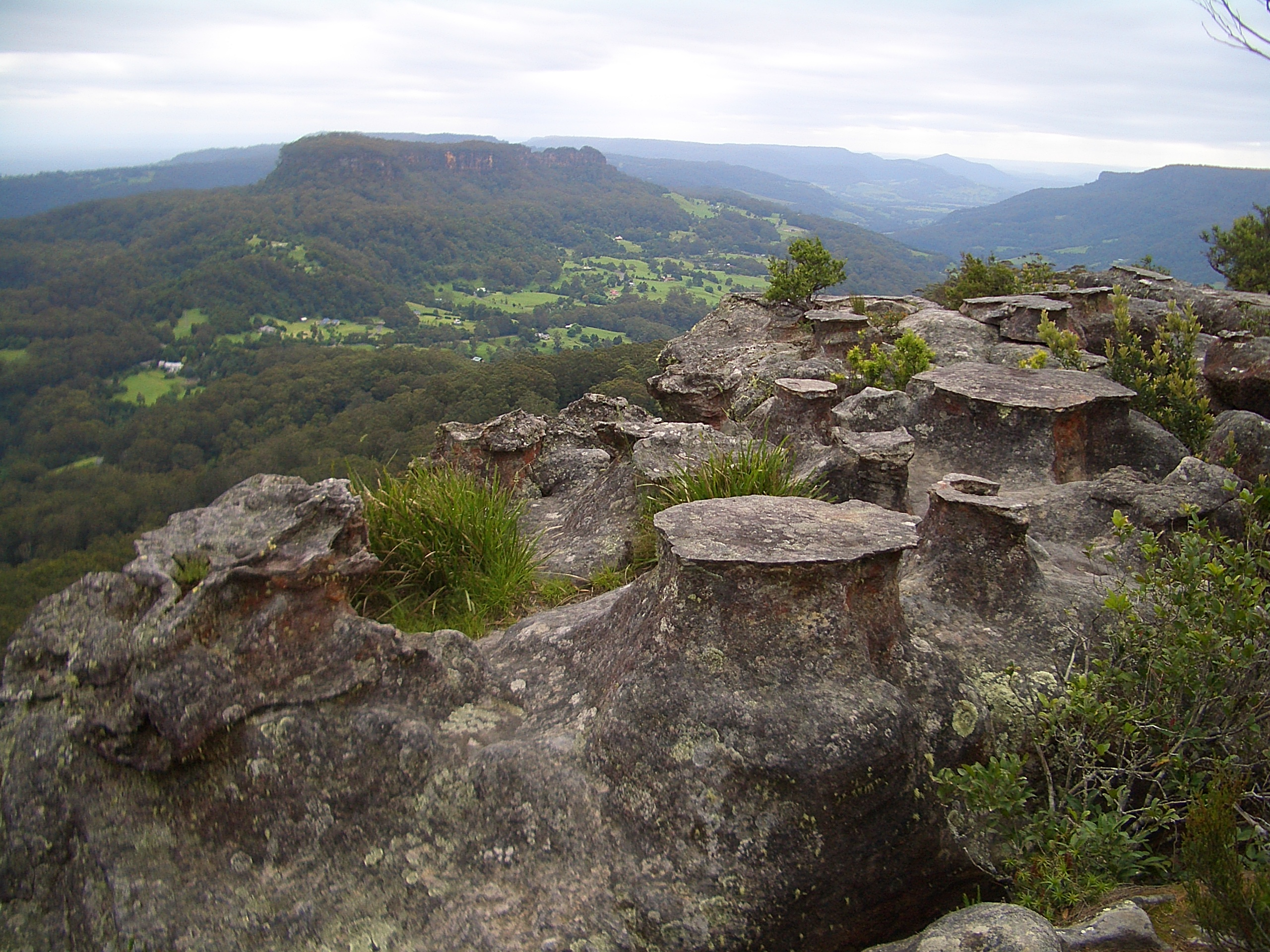
- Drawing Room Rocks

- Location within New South Wales
- Location: New South Wales
- Coordinates: 34°41′S 150°43′E
- Area: 20 km^{2} (7.7 sq mi)
- Established: 1956
- Governing body: NSW National Parks & Wildlife Service
- Website: https://www.nationalparks.nsw.gov.au/visit-a-park/parks/barren-grounds-nature-reserve

The Barren Grounds Nature Reserve is a protected nature park located in the Southern Highlands region of New South Wales, Australia. The 2,024-hectare (5,000-acre) reserve is situated east of Budderoo National Park, and west of the city of Kiama. The reserve can also be accessed from the south, via a local road and a bush walk from the town of Berry. It is not far from the Nameless Sylvan Reserve owned by Bush Heritage Australia.

The nature reserve has several good lookouts that offer views of the coast. Interesting rock formations can be seen at Drawing Room Rocks, a geological feature in the southern part of the reserve. The former Barren Grounds Bird Observatory is located in the park.

== Birds ==
The reserve is part of the 7,334-hectare (18,120-acre) Budderoo and Barren Grounds Important Bird Area which contains large numbers of endangered eastern bristlebirds, as well as smaller numbers of pilotbirds and rockwarblers, in a mosaic of sandstone heath and eucalypt woodland habitats.

== See also ==
- Flying Fox Pass
- Protected areas of New South Wales
