= John Colahan Griffin Nature Reserve =

Nature reserve in Australia

- Location within Victoria
- Location: Victoria
- Nearest city: St Arnaud, Victoria
- Coordinates: 36.312°S 143.552°E
- Area: 96 ha (240 acres)
- Established: 2011
- Governing body: Bush Heritage Australia
- Website: Official website

The John Colahan Griffin Nature Reserve is a conservation reserve in north-central Victoria, on Dja Dja Wurrung Country in south-eastern Australia. It lies 185 km north-west of Melbourne. It was acquired in 2011 by the nature conservation charity Bush Heritage Australia with a legacy gift from John Colahan Griffin.

== Description ==
The reserve lies between St Arnaud Range National Park and Dalyenong Nature Conservation Reserve. It contains old-growth eucalypt woodland, including long-leaved box and yellow gum trees, some of which are very large and likely to be over 300 years old.

=== Flora and fauna ===
Vegetation communities represented are grassy woodland, heathy dry forest, box-ironbark forest and alluvial terraces herb-rich woodland. Nationally endangered red cross and Stuart Mill spider orchids are present. Animals recorded from the reserve include swift parrots, brown treecreepers, crested bellbirds, painted and black-chinned honeyeaters, fat-tailed dunnarts, lace monitors and woodland blind snakes.
