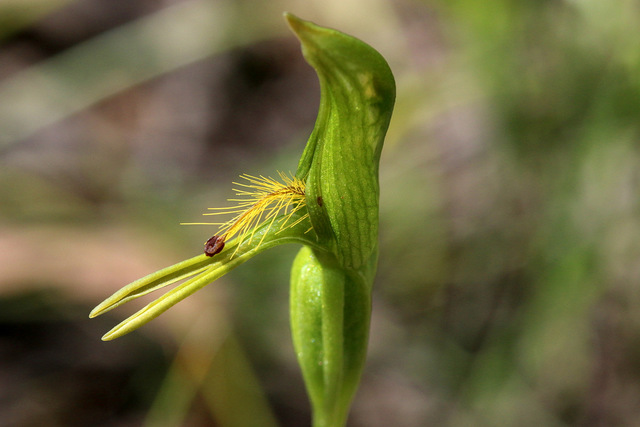
- Pterostylis tasmanica growing near Torquay

Scientific classification
- Kingdom: Plantae
- Clade: Tracheophytes
- Clade: Angiosperms
- Clade: Monocots
- Order: Asparagales
- Family: Orchidaceae
- Subfamily: Orchidoideae
- Tribe: Cranichideae
- Genus: Pterostylis
- Species: P. tasmanica

Binomial name
- Pterostylis tasmanica D.L.Jones

Synonyms
- Plumatichilos tasmanica (D.L.Jones) Szlach.

= Pterostylis tasmanica =

Small bearded greenhood

Species of orchid

Pterostylis tasmanica, commonly known as the small bearded greenhood, is a species of orchid in the family Orchidaceae which is native to south-eastern Australia and New Zealand. It has a single green flower with translucent "windows" and a long, thin labellum bordered with golden hairs. It is similar to P. plumosa but is shorter, with smaller leaves and flowers but a more densely feathery labellum.

== Description ==
Pterostylis tasmanica is a terrestrial, perennial, deciduous, herb with an underground tuber . It has between eight and fourteen dark green leaves crowded around the base of the stem and extending upwards, the leaves 10–25 millimetres (0.4–1 in) long and 3–7 millimetres (0.1–0.3 in) wide. Flowering plants have a single green flower with translucent green panels, the flower 18–25 millimetres (0.7–1 in) long and 6–8 millimetres (0.2–0.3 in) wide arranged on a flowering stem 80–140 millimetres (3–6 in) high. The dorsal sepal and petals are fused to form a hood or "galea" over the column, the dorsal sepal with a short point on its end. The lateral sepals are turned downwards, joined near their bases with tapering tips 7–11 mm (0.3–0.4 in) long. The labellum 12–15 millimetres (0.5–0.6 in) long, bearded with bright yellow hairs up to 3 millimetres (0.1 in) long and ending in a dark brown knob. The flowers appear from September to November.

== Taxonomy and naming ==
Pterostylis tasmanica was first described in 1994 by David Jones and the description was published in Muelleria from a specimen collected near Temma in the Arthur-Pieman Conservation Area. The specific epithet (tasmanica) is refers to the distribution of this greenhood "being centred around Tasmania and the Tasmanian basin".

== Distribution and habitat ==
The small bearded greenhood grows in coastal heath and scrub. It is widespread in Tasmania but also occurs on the south coast of New South Wales, southern Victoria the south-east of South Australia and on both the North and South Islands of New Zealand.

== Ecology ==
Pterostylis tasmanica is autogamous and the ovary is already swollen when the flowers open.
