= Békesi =

Békesi, Békési, Békésy or Békesy or Bekessy is a surname, related to the area of the original castle Békés and its noble family, and the present town of the same name.

Notable people with the surname include:

- Eszter Békési (born 2002), Hungarian swimmer
- Georg von Békésy (1899–1972), born György Békésy, Hungarian biophysicist, awarded the 1961 Nobel Prize in Physiology or Medicine
- Ilona Békési (born 1953), retired Hungarian gymnast
- László Békesi (born 1942), Hungarian politician
- Sándor Békési (1928–1994), Hungarian gymnast
- Sarah Bekessy, Australian interdisciplinary conservation scientist
- Hans Habe, born János Békessy (1911–1977), a Hungarian and American writer and newspaper publisher.
- Gáspár Bekes (1520–1579), a Hungarian nobleman
