= Yarrabee Wesfarmers Reserve =

Protected area in Western Australia

- IUCN category IV (habitat/species management area)
- Location within Western Australia
- Location: Western Australia
- Nearest city: Albany, Western Australia
- Coordinates: 34.331°S 118.412°E
- Area: 9.23 km^{2} (3.56 sq mi)
- Established: 2006
- Governing body: Greening Australia
- Website: Official website

Yarrabee Wesfarmers Reserve is a 9.23 km^{2} nature reserve in south-west Western Australia. It is 120 km north-east of Albany and 481 km south-east of Perth. It lies on the eastern boundary of the Stirling Range National Park, and is managed by Greening Australia.

The reserve was jointly purchased in 2006 by Bush Heritage Australia and Greening Australia (WA), and forms part of the Gondwana Link project. In 2020, in the interests of efficient management, Bush Heritage transferred ownership of this reserve to Greening Australia in full

== Flora and fauna ==
The reserve protects a large area of remnant vegetation, including tall marri and jarrah woodland, low mallee and Banksia woodland. About 600 ha of the reserve was previously cleared and is being revegetated by Greening Australia. Animals expected to be present include malleefowl, western pygmy possums and honey possums, as well as many other species of birds and reptiles.
