= Beringa Reserve =

Protected area in Western Australia

- Location within Western Australia
- Location: Western Australia
- Nearest city: Albany, Western Australia
- Coordinates: 34.068°S 118.860°E
- Area: 1,147 ha (4.43 sq mi)
- Established: 2007
- Governing body: Bush Heritage Australia
- Website: https://www.bushheritage.org.au/places/beringa

Beringa Reserve, formerly known as Peniup Creek Reserve, is a nature reserve in south-west Western Australia. It lies about 380 km south-east of Perth. It is owned and managed by Bush Heritage Australia (BHA), by which it was purchased jointly with Greening Australia (WA) in 2007, and forms part of the Gondwana Link project, in which BHA is a partner.

Beringa Reserve takes its name from the War Settlement Scheme property assigned to John and Hazel Canny in the late 50s.

== Flora and fauna ==
The reserve protects yate, mallet and moort woodland as well as mallee heath vegetation and riparian communities along the upper Peniup Creek. Much of the reserve was previously cleared and is now regenerating or planned to be revegetated. Animals either recorded, or expected to be present, include black-gloved wallaby, tammar wallaby and red-tailed phascogale.

The nearby Peniup Nature Reserve is used for the DEC recovery program for the Dibbler (Parantechinus apicalis), an attempt to conserve this endangered species by its reintroduction.
