= Sarah Bekessy =

Australian conservation scientist

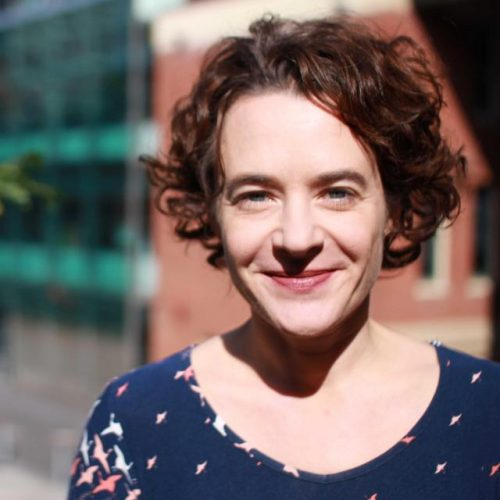
- Sarah Bekessy, RMIT University
- Education: University of Queensland; University of Melbourne
- Known for: Biodiversity sensitive urban design; Threatened species management; Environmental decision analysis; Urban ecology; Population and landscape modelling; Education for sustainability; The role of science in environmental policy
- Website: https://iconscience.org/

Sarah Bekessy is an Australian interdisciplinary conservation scientist with a background in conservation biology and experience in social sciences, planning, and design. Her research interests focus on the intersection between science, policy, and the design of environmental management. She is currently a professor and ARC Future Fellow at RMIT University (Melbourne, Australia) in the School of Global, Urban and Social Studies. She leads the Interdisciplinary Conservation Science Research Group (ICON Science).

== Education ==
Sarah Bekessy started her post-secondary education at University of Queensland in Queensland, Australia where she attained a Bachelor of Science (Hons). Bekessy completed her doctorate (1999 – 2003) at the School of Botany, University of Melbourne, Victoria, Australia, where she studied approaches for the conservation of threatened Monkey Puzzle Tree.

== Career ==
Following her PhD, Sarah Bekessy was a research fellow with the University of Melbourne (funded by David Yencken, the Australian Collaboration) where she studied sustainability and policy. Before joining RMIT University in 2004, Bekessy held a research fellowship with the Canadian Forest Service, where she worked on landscape modelling for evaluating forest management strategies. Bekessy has been with RMIT University as a lecturer and professor in the School of Global, Urban and Social Studies since 2004, and teaches specialized courses in sustainability, urban, rural and regional planning, and conservation biology, as well as various courses on environmental practices. She has supervised a number of graduate and post-graduate students.

Bekessy is involved in a range of interdisciplinary research, including her ARC Future Fellowship titled 'Socio-ecological models for environmental decision making'. She also has an ARC Linkage project entitled 'Designing green spaces for biodiversity and human well-being'. She is the convener of ICON Science, a group of researchers working to better understand and manage societal and natural environment interaction, seeking methods to solve real world problems, regardless of what discipline these solutions originate from.

In addition to her academic role, Bekessy engages actively in consulting projects, and has worked on projects with the Commonwealth Department of the Environment and the Department of Environment, Land, Water and Planning, among others. Bekessy is a member of the editorial board of Conservation Letters and Natural Resources Modelling and a past member of the editorial board of Conservation and Society.

== Collaborations ==
Bekessy's research is interdisciplinary and collaborative, focusing on developing practical solutions for environmental problems, conservation, and urban planning. She helps bring "the people" into the conservation discussion and investigates social and political aspects of conservation decision making. Her group brings together experts in social science, ecology, physics, psychology and many other disciplines.

Bekessy is a project leader in the Threatened Species Recovery Hub (Theme 6), and a theme leader in the Clean Air and Urban Landscapes Hub of the Commonwealth Environment Science Program. She also acted as a theme leader for the ARC Centre of Excellence for Environmental Decisions (2012–2018;), and is a chief investigator with the Horizon2020 Urban GreenUP and the UN Habitat: Enhancing urban resilience to climate change impacts and natural disasters. Bekessy is also a member of the Environmental Decision Group and a member of the Green Building Council Expert Advisory Committee for Biodiversity and Ecology.

== Research contributions ==
Bekessy's work contributes to the development of collaborative solutions for conservation. Bekessy has published work on nature-based solutions for cities, such as urban pop-up parks for insect biodiversity and wildlife gardening, conservation of natural features, biodiversity and threatened species in cities. She has also published on technical and policy issues surrounding biodiversity conservation, including the integration of conservation and land-use planning in urban landscape design, the use of market-based instruments for biodiversity conservation, such as biodiversity banking or nature off-setting, population modelling, and climate change adaptation. Bekessy's work has included commentary on institutional change for sustainability and sustainability education, as well as science and conservation communication, including the impact of messaging to influence human behaviour, targeting high impact behaviour. Bekessy's work has contributed to the efforts toward "re-enchanting people with nature" and has been instrumental in the development of programs to reconnect children to everyday nature, biodiversity and cultural heritage. She is an advocate for increased transparency and evidence in biodiversity conservation strategy development, and for increasing and improving collaborative and interdisciplinary solutions for the environment.

Bekessy's team has been involved in research to help shape future policy designed to improve landholder participation in, and collaboration on, private land conservation schemes. Some examples that Bekessy's team have helped influence include Greenfleet bio-carbon plantings, and reverse auctions in Western Australia.

During her career Bekessy has published over 100 articles and conference proceedings, over a dozen book chapters, and has co-authored three books, including the children's book The Little Things that Run the City: 30 amazing insects that live in Melbourne! which was produced as part of the development of the City of Melbourne Urban forest and Nature in the City Strategies and has been used by children in Melbourne during Nature Play Week and in schools around Melbourne.

== Research impacts ==
The application of Bekessy's work on the preservation of biodiversity in cities has included working with Green Building Council, to develop a green star rating system for biodiversity in building, leading to the Biodiversity Sensitive Urban Design (BSUD) protocol. The protocol received an A+ from The Industry News and Analysis blog "Sourceable's Living Infrastructure Report Card" in 2016. Bekessy and her team have contributed to biodiversity plans for local, state, and international agencies. She has also worked with urban developers on projects such as Fisherman's Bend, Melbourne. They continue to improve the development of biodiverse cities through their research, such as the application of ecological principles that can increase biodiversity in cities through "more-than-human" planning and the designing of actions that can help multiply biological diversity.

ICON Science and Bekessy's work has also informed scenarios for the future of Cumberland Plain Woodland, in Sydney, Australia. Her team has been involved in strategic assessments including those done in Melbourne and their recently completed, 'Reimagining the Australian Suburb: planning for biodiversity in the urban fringe' (funded by the Myer Foundation), may help inform the creation of new grassland reserves and guide development planning for the avoidance of important grassland features and their protection in urban fringe areas. Work by Bekessy and her team was used in the development of the City of Melbourne Urban Forest and Nature in the City Strategies, including a biodiversity connectivity plan, and surveys of insect biodiversity in the City of Melbourne.

== Public roles ==
Bekessy sits as a board member of Bush Heritage Australia, an independent not-for-profit that purchases and manages land, in partnership with Aboriginal people, for the protection of important landscapes and native species. She is also an Urban Scholar with the United Nations Global Compact – Cities Programme, as well as a member of the reference group for Victoria's Biodiversity Strategy.

== Notable awards and honours ==
In 2015 Bekessy was awarded the Vice-Chancellor's Research Award from RMIT University, and in 2016 was a Banksia Foundation Award Finalist, Biodiversity Sensitive Urban Design. She has also received the Brian Robinson Fellowship for Environmental Sustainability (2005).

== Selected publications ==
- Garrard, G. E., Williams, N. S. G., Mata, L., Thomas, J., & Bekessy, S. A. (2018). Biodiversity Sensitive Urban Design. Conservation Letters, 11(2), e12411. https://doi.org/10.1111/conl.12411
- Gordon, A., Simondson, D., White, M., Moilanen, A., & Bekessy, S. A. (2009). Integrating conservation planning and landuse planning in urban landscapes. Landscape and Urban Planning, 91(4), 183–194. https://doi.org/10.1016/j.landurbplan.2008.12.011
- Hardy, M. J., Bekessy, S. A., Fitzsimons, J. A., Mata, L., Cook, C., Nankivell, A., ... Gordon, A. (2018). Protecting nature on private land using revolving funds: Assessing property suitability. Biological Conservation, 220, 84–93. https://doi.org/10.1016/j.biocon.2018.01.026
- Selinske, M., Cooke, B., Torabi, N., Hardy, M., Knight, A., & Bekessy, S. (2017). Locating financial incentives among diverse motivations for long-term private land conservation. Ecology and Society, 22(2). https://doi.org/10.5751/ES-09148-220207

== Recent publications ==
- Backstrom, A. C., Garrard, G. E., Hobbs, R. J., & Bekessy, S. A. (2018). Grappling with the social dimensions of novel ecosystems. Frontiers in Ecology and the Environment, 16(2), 109–117. https://doi.org/10.1002/fee.1769
- Butt, N., Shanahan, D. F., Shumway, N., Bekessy, S. A., Fuller, R. A., Watson, J. E. M., ... Hole, D.G. (2018). Opportunities for biodiversity conservation as cities adapt to climate change. Geo: Geography and Environment, 5(1), e00052. https://doi.org/10.1002/geo2.52
- Guerrero, A., Bennett, N., Wilson, K., Carter, N., Gill, D., Mills, M., ... Nuno, A. (2018). Achieving the promise of integration in social-ecological research: A review and prospectus. Ecology and Society, 23(3). https://doi.org/10.5751/ES-10232-230338
- Kidd, L. R., Bekessy, S. A., & Garrard, G. E. (2019a). Evidence Is Key for Effective Biodiversity Communication. Trends in Ecology & Evolution, 34(8), 693–694. https://doi.org/10.1016/j.tree.2019.05.010
- Kidd, L. R., Bekessy, S. A., & Garrard, G. E. (2019b). Neither Hope nor Fear: Empirical Evidence Should Drive Biodiversity Conservation Strategies. Trends in Ecology & Evolution, 34(4), 278–282. https://doi.org/10.1016/j.tree.2019.01.018
- Kidd, L. R., Gregg, E. A., Bekessy, S. A., Robinson, J. A., & Garrard, G. E. (2018). Tweeting for their lives: Visibility of threatened species on twitter. Journal for Nature Conservation, 46, 106–109. https://doi.org/10.1016/j.jnc.2018.10.001
- Mata, L., Garrard, G. E., Fidler, F., Ives, C. D., Maller, C., Wilson, J., ... Bekessy, S. A. (2019). Punching above their weight: The ecological and social benefits of pop-up parks. Frontiers in Ecology and the Environment, 17(6), 341–347. https://doi.org/10.1002/fee.2060
- Meiklejohn, D., Bekessy, S., & Moloney, S. (2018). Shifting practices: How the rise of rooftop solar PV has changed local government community engagement. Cogent Environmental Science, 4(1), 1481584. https://doi.org/10.1080/23311843.2018.1481584
- Parris, K. M., Amati, M., Bekessy, S. A., Dagenais, D., Fryd, O., Hahs, A. K., ... Williams, N. S. G. (2018). The seven lamps of planning for biodiversity in the city. Cities, 83, 44–53. https://doi.org/10.1016/j.cities.2018.06.007
- Selinske, M. J., Garrard, G. E., Bekessy, S. A., Gordon, A., Kusmanoff, A. M., & Fidler, F. (2018). Revisiting the promise of conservation psychology. Conservation Biology, 32(6), 1464–1468. https://doi.org/10.1111/cobi.13106
- Wintle, B., Kujalah, H., Whitehead, A., Cameron, A., Veloz, S., Kukkala, A., ... Bekessy, S. (2019). Global synthesis of conservation studies reveals the importance of small habitat patches for biodiversity. Proceedings of the National Academy of Sciences of the United States of America, 116, 909–914.
