= Greenfleet =

Australian not-for-profit organisation

- Founded: 1997
- Location: Melbourne, Australia
- Region served: Australia
- Key people: Wayne Wescott CEO
- Website: www.greenfleet.com.au

Greenfleet is an Australian not-for-profit environmental organisation focused on protecting the climate by restoring native forests.

== History ==
Originally developed as a project of The Foster Foundation, Greenfleet was launched in October 1997 to offer Australian motorists a tree-planting program to re-capture CO_{2} emissions, and promote fuel-efficient technologies to reduce emissions at the source.

== Carbon offsetting through tree planting ==
Greenfleet plants native biodiverse forests to offset carbon emissions on behalf of individuals and businesses and help fight the impacts of climate change. Since 1997, the organisation has planted more than 10 million native trees across over 550 biodiverse forests in Australia and New Zealand.

Greenfleet forests address critical deforestation, capture carbon emissions to protect the climate, reduce soil erosion, improve water quality and restore habitat for wildlife, including many endangered species.

== Projects ==
Greenfleet is focused on delivering projects with strong environmental outcomes, along with social and economic co-benefits. Their projects are funded by individual and corporate supporter donations.

Greenfleet works with a wide range of project partners, including federal, state and local government, corporate partners and peer environmental organisations. They actively seek out partnerships with organisations committed to taking practical action on climate change and the environment.

While all their forestry projects are designed to protect the climate, Greenfleet also work to deliver additional community benefits, including:

- restoration of native ecosystems
- biodiversity and endangered species protection
- improved land and soil productivity
- health and well-being
- job creation
- community engagement

=== Low Glow ===
Greenfleet is working to protect Australia's endangered sea turtle population through the creation of "low glow" coastal communities.

The Low Glow project aims to protect Queensland's endangered sea turtle population and engage the local community to reduce artificial light glow around important turtle nesting sites.

Since 2017, Greenfleet has planted over 90,000 native trees in Barolin Nature Reserve in Bundaberg, Queensland. This is the largest ever reforestation project in the region, with the forest expected to absorb more than 65,000 tonnes of carbon.

The growing forest has been designed to protect the local sea turtle population at neighbouring Mon Repos beach. As the trees grow, they will form a "green curtain" to shield the sea turtle hatchery from artificial light pollution.

=== Kowanyama community planting project ===
In 2018, Greenfleet, Telstra employees and Kowanyama Aboriginal Shire Council joined forces to plant over 1,000 native and fruit trees in the remote community of Kowanyama, Far North Queensland.

This revegetation project is intended to deliver a wide range of benefits, including environmental, health and well-being outcomes for the local community.

=== Climate change research project at Nardoo Hills ===
Greenfleet has joined forces with Bush Heritage Australia on a climate-ready revegetation project at Nardoo Hills Reserve in central Victoria, Australia.

This project is designed to protect and restore temperate woodlands—the most threatened wooded ecosystem in Australia—and contribute to climate change resilience.

Spanning 1,200 hectares, Nardoo Hills Reserve has experienced dieback of two Eucalypt species–grey box (Eucalyptus microcarpa) and yellow box (Eucalyptus melliodora). The dieback is affecting both older and younger trees that provide crucial habitat for native wildlife, including the hooded robin, yellow-tufted honeyeater, brown treecreeper and tree goanna.

Using data sourced from the Bureau of Meteorology, the project has modelled the regional climate for the next 30 to 70 years. As a result, the seeds to be planted in the trial have been sourced from trees in New South Wales and South Australia that currently experience hotter and drier climates.

The large-scale trial is intended to diversify the Eucalypt species’ gene pool and aims to "future-proof" Nardoo Hills as temperatures increase and rainfall patterns change.

== Reconciliation Action Plan ==
In 2021, Greenfleet gained approval of a Reconciliation Action Plan from Reconciliation Australia. This plan will see the organisation take steps towards working more closely with Aboriginal and Torres Strait Islander people and to play a more proactive role in reconciliation.
