= Monjebup =

Monjebup may refer to:

- Monjebup, Western Australia, a locality in the Shire of Gnowangerup
- Monjebup Reserve, a nature reserve in south-west Western Australia
