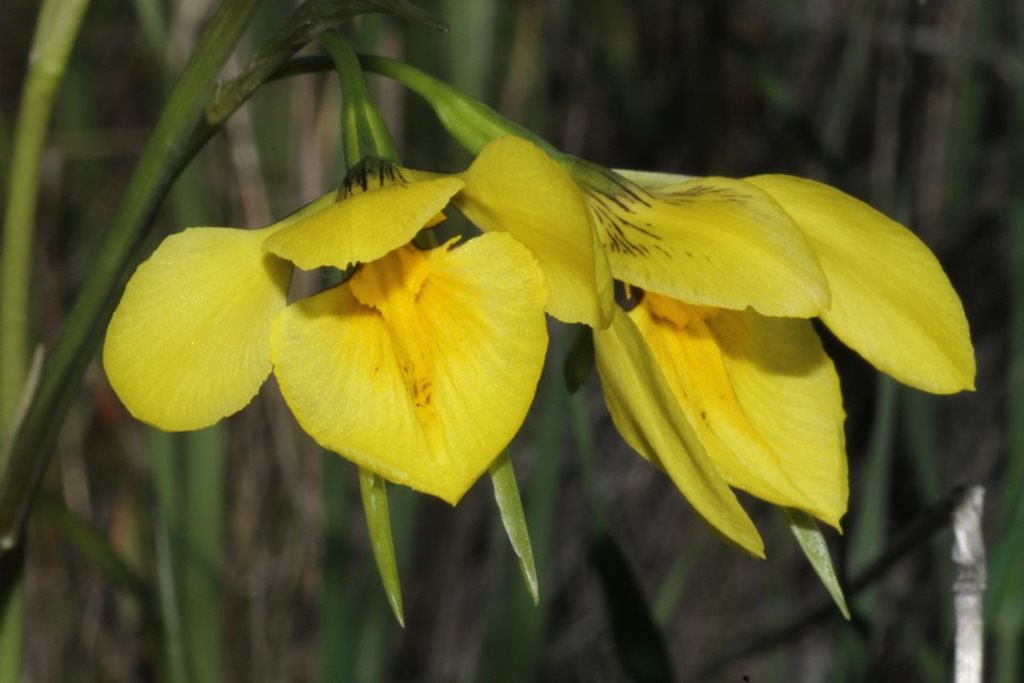
- In the Mount Jeffcott Nature Conservation Reserve

Scientific classification
- Kingdom: Plantae
- Clade: Tracheophytes
- Clade: Angiosperms
- Clade: Monocots
- Order: Asparagales
- Family: Orchidaceae
- Subfamily: Orchidoideae
- Tribe: Diurideae
- Genus: Diuris
- Species: D. protena

Binomial name
- Diuris protena D.L. Jones

= Diuris protena =

Northern golden moths

Species of orchid

Diuris protena, commonly known as northern golden moths, is a species of orchid which is endemic to Victoria. It has a tuft of between four and eight leaves at the base and up to three mostly yellow flowers with a few light-coloured marks. It is classed as "endangered" in Victoria.

== Description ==
Diuris protena is a tuberous, perennial herb with between four and eight linear leaves 70–120 mm (3–5 in) long and 1–3 mm (0.04–0.1 in) wide in a loose tussock. Up to three flowers 15–25 mm (0.6–1 in) wide are borne on a flowering stem 120–200 mm (5–8 in) tall. The flowers are pale yellow with a few light brown markings at the base of the dorsal sepal and labellum. The dorsal sepal is held more or less horizontally and is egg-shaped, 9–15 mm (0.4–0.6 in) long and 3–8 mm (0.1–0.3 in) wide. The lateral sepals are narrow linear to lance-shaped with the narrower end towards the base, 13–20 mm (0.5–0.8 in) long, 1.5–3 mm (0.06–0.1 in) wide, turned downwards and parallel to each other. The petals are directed forwards with a more or less egg-shaped blade 7–15 mm (0.3–0.6 in) long and 3.5–7 mm (0.1–0.3 in) wide on a greenish-brown stalk 3–5 mm (0.1–0.2 in) long. The labellum is 10–18 mm (0.4–0.7 in) long and has three lobes. The centre lobe is egg-shaped, 7–14 mm (0.3–0.6 in) long, 6–10 mm (0.2–0.4 in) wide and the side lobes are oblong to wedge-shaped, 2–3.5 mm (0.08–0.1 in) long and about 1.5 mm (0.06 in) wide. There are two broad, pimply calli in the mid-line of the base of the labellum. Flowering occurs in August and September.

== Taxonomy and naming ==
Diuris protena was first formally described in 2006 by David Jones from a specimen collected in the Terrick Terrick National Park in 2004. The specific epithet (protena) is a Latin word meaning "before" or "forward", referring to the early flowering of this orchid.

== Distribution and habitat ==
The orchid is known from sites in northern and north-western Victoria between Donald, Terrick Terrick and Elmore. It is found in remnants of Victoria’s native grassland and grassy woodland habitats. The largest population, of some 400 plants, was discovered at Bush Heritage Australia’s Nardoo Hills Reserves, 60 km south-west of Terrick Terrick, in yellow box woodland on the slopes of Mount Kerang. A likely pollinator of the orchid is a native bee that also pollinates bulbine lilies, similar in colour and size to the orchid, that are found in the same habitat.

== Conservation ==
Almost all of the orchid’s habitat has been cleared for farming, with remaining sites threatened by weed infestation. In 2007 the population was estimated to comprise several hundred plants. The species is listed as endangered under Victoria’s Flora and Fauna Guarantee Act 1988.
