= Brogo Reserve =

- Location within New South Wales
- Location: New South Wales
- Coordinates: 36°30′38.66″S 149°46′48″E
- Area: 1.22 km^{2} (0.47 sq mi)
- Established: 1995
- Governing body: Bush Heritage Australia
- Website: http://www.bushheritage.org.au/places-we-protect/state_new_south_wales/reserves_brogo

The Brogo Reserve is a 122-hectare (300-acre) nature reserve on Yuin djiringanj Country in Brogo, owned and managed by the nature conservation charity Bush Heritage Australia. It is located at the north-eastern end of the Bega Valley in south-eastern New South Wales—409 kilometres (254 mi) south of Sydney and 30 kilometres (19 mi) north of Bega.

== Features ==
=== Landscape ===
Brogo is located in a transitional zone between the coastal hinterland and forested foothills of the Great Dividing Ranges of southern New South Wales. The reserve encompasses three forested ridges, with granite outcrops, separated by fern gullies.

=== Flora ===
Vegetation types include riparian oak forest along the Brogo River, dry grass forest, dry rainforest and wet shrub forest. The reserve contains possibly the largest remaining stand of Brogo Wet Vine Forest.

=== Fauna ===
Fauna have been surveyed on the reserve using ground-based remote sensing cameras for ground-dwelling mammals, and tree-top cameras for tree-dwelling mammals. Call-playback and spotlighting have been used for forest owls, acoustic monitoring has been deployed to record bats bats. Daytime bird surveys have been done visually and by call identification

Mammal species present on Brogo include the sugar glider, brush-tailed and ring-tailed possum possums, common wombat and long-nosed bandicoot. The reserve is home to 70 indigenous bird species, including the powerful owl.

=== Management ===
Brogo remained unburnt during the 2019-2020 Black Summer bushfires and was an important refuge for wildlife. However the potential impacts of fire remains a sign significant concern. A fire management plan is being developed by Bush Heritage..

Grazing by deer and predation by foxes and cats have been identified as significant threats to native flora and fauna on the reserve. Control programs are being implimented for cats and foxes, and the deer population is being monitored with motion sensing cameras. Infestations of the invasive plant species Tiger Pear and Tree of Heaven are being controlled by volunteers.

== See also ==
- Protected areas of New South Wales
