= Nardoo Hills Reserves =

Nardoo Hills Reserve
- Location within Victoria
- Location: Victoria
- Nearest city: Wedderburn, Victoria
- Coordinates: 36°19′11″S 143°32′51″E
- Area: 976 ha (2,410 acres)
- Established: 2004
- Governing body: Bush Heritage Australia
- Website: Official website

The Nardoo Hills Reserves (including the Judith Eardley Reserve) is a nature reserve in north-central Victoria, Australia on Dja Dja Wurrung Country. It is located 12 km north of Wedderburn, 100 km north-west of Bendigo and 240 km north-west of Melbourne. The reserve is owned and managed by the nature conservation charity Bush Heritage Australia. With the nearby Wychitella Nature Conservation Reserve, it protects remnant grassy woodlands, a habitat much cleared in the past. A threatened bird species found on the reserves is the Hooded Robin In 2007 an endangered plant, the Northern Golden Moth Orchid was found on the reserve. In 2009 a species of orchid thought to be extinct, the Robust Greenhood, was rediscovered there.
