= Chereninup Creek Reserve =

Nature reserve in Western Australia

- Location within Western Australia
- Location: Western Australia
- Nearest city: Jerramungup
- Coordinates: 34.134°S 118.738°E
- Area: 889 ha (2,200 acres)
- Governing body: Bush Heritage Australia
- Website: https://www.bushheritage.org.au/places/chereninup-creek

Chereninup Creek Reserve is a nature reserve in south-west Western Australia. It is 340 kilometres (211 mi) west of Esperance, 140 km (87 mi) north-east of Albany and 430 km (270 mi) south-east of Perth. It is located between the Stirling Range National Park and the Fitzgerald River National Park, on the southern edge of the Wheatbelt, and is owned and managed by Bush Heritage Australia (BHA), by which it was purchased in 2003, and forms part of BHA's Gondwana Link project.

== Landscape ==
The reserve comprises undulating country vegetated with woodlands, shrublands and Kwongan heath communities. Chereninup Creek flows through it. An area of about 60 ha of the reserve was previously cleared but has since been revegetated. The flora is very rich with a high diversity of Eucalyptus, Dryandra and Banksia species.
