= South Esk =

South Esk may refer to:

- The southern tributary of the River Esk, Lothian, Midlothian and East Lothian, Scotland
- River South Esk, Angus, Scotland
- South Esk River, Tasmania, Australia
- South Esk Pine (Callitris oblonga), conifer found in Tasmania
- South Esk Pine Reserve, Tasmania, Australia
- South Esk, New Brunswick, town in New Brunswick, Canada

== See also ==
- River Esk (disambiguation)
