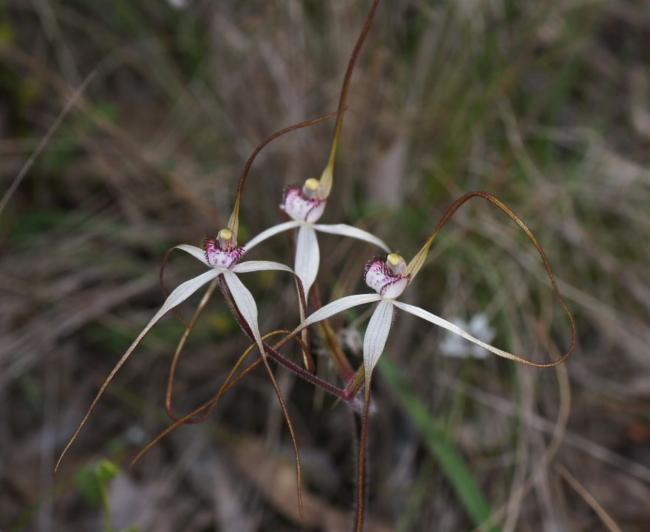

Conservation status
- Critically endangered (EPBC Act)

Scientific classification
- Kingdom: Plantae
- Clade: Tracheophytes
- Clade: Angiosperms
- Clade: Monocots
- Order: Asparagales
- Family: Orchidaceae
- Subfamily: Orchidoideae
- Tribe: Diurideae
- Genus: Caladenia
- Species: C. cretacea

Binomial name
- Caladenia cretacea (D.L.Jones) G.N.Backh.

Synonyms
- Arachnorchis cretacea D.L.Jones

= Caladenia cretacea =

Stuart Mill spider orchid

Species of orchid

Caladenia cretacea, commonly known as Stuart Mill spider orchid, is a plant in the orchid family Orchidaceae and is endemic to a small area in Victoria. It is a rare ground orchid with a single leaf and one or two white flowers on a hairy stalk.

== Description ==
Caladenia cretacea is a terrestrial, perennial, deciduous, herb with a spherical underground tuber and a single lance-shaped, reddish-green leaf, 5–12 cm (2–5 in) long and 6–10 mm (0.2–0.4 in) wide.

One or two white or greyish-white flowers with reddish-brown tips are borne on a hairy spike 20–35 cm (8–10 in) tall. The flowers have a fragrance resembling hot metal. The petals and sepals are 3.5–6 cm (1–2 in) long and sometimes have a reddish line along their centres. The dorsal sepal is erect and the lateral sepals and petals spread widely but with drooping ends. The sepals are flat near their bases and 2.5–4 mm (0.1–0.2 in) wide at the base and taper to a thread-like end with reddish-brown glandular hairs. The petals are similar to the sepals but slightly shorter. The labellum is narrow triangular to lance-shaped, 14–16 mm (0.55–0.63 in) long and 8–10 mm (0.3–0.4 in) wide when flattened and curves downward at the tip. It is cream-coloured with reddish lines. The sides of the labellum turn upwards and have reddish a fringe of linear teeth mostly 0.5–2 mm (0.02–0.08 in) long but decreasing in size towards the front. There are about four rows of foot-shaped calli along the centre of the labellum, decreasing in size towards the front. Flowering occurs between late August and early October.

== Taxonomy and naming ==
This species was first formally described by David L. Jones in 2006 and given the name Arachnorchis cretacea. The description was published in Australian Orchid Research, based on a specimen found in the Dalyenong Nature Conservation Reserve. In 2007, Gary Backhouse changed the name to Caladenia cretacea, publishing the name change in The Victorian Naturalist. The specific epithet (cretacea) is a Latin word meaning "chalky", referring to the dull white to grey colour of the flowers of this orchid.

== Distribution and habitat ==
Stuart Mill spider orchid grows in eucalypt forest with a heathy understorey. It is only known from the John Colahan Griffin Nature Reserve near Stuart Mill.

== Conservation ==
Caladenia cretacea is listed as "Endangered" under the Victorian Government Flora and Fauna Guarantee Act 1988. A successful program of propagation and reintroduction of the species has been undertaken, 70 of the 124 individuals planted having survived as at 2016. The main threats to the species are weed invasion and grazing by native animals and rabbits and as "Critically Endangered" under the Commonwealth Government Environment Protection and Biodiversity Conservation Act 1999 (EPBC) Act.
