= Fan Palm Reserve =

Natural reserve in Far North Queensland, Australia

Coordinates: 16.2002°S 145.4186°E

Fan Palm Reserve is an 8.2 ha nature reserve in Far North Queensland, Australia. It is located in the Wet Tropics of Queensland World Heritage Site, 20 km north of Daintree and 40 km north of Mossman. It is owned and managed by Bush Heritage Australia (BHA), who purchased it in 1993.

== History ==
The reserve is part of an area traditionally used by the Kuku Yalangi people for gathering food. Its purchase by BHA, the organisation's first outside Tasmania, reflects the concern felt in the early 1990s about the subdivision of large areas of the Daintree Rainforest north of the Daintree River.

== Flora and fauna ==
The reserve contains remnant lowland rainforest (mesophyll vine forest) dominated by the fan palm (Licuala ramsayi). As well as many other plants of conservation significance it, and adjoining uncleared areas, also protect the habitat of threatened rainforest animals such as the southern cassowary, striped possum and Bennett's tree-kangaroo. Management issues are dealing with weeds and feral pigs.
