= Reedy Creek Reserve =

Nature reserve in Queensland, Australia

- Location within Queensland
- Location: Queensland
- Nearest city: Agnes Water, Queensland
- Coordinates: 24.230°S 151.919°E
- Area: 543 ha (1,340 acres)
- Established: 2004
- Governing body: Bush Heritage Australia
- Website: Official website

Reedy Creek Reserve is a nature reserve on the coast of south-eastern Queensland, Australia, 3 km south of the expanding tourist township of Agnes Water and borders the Deepwater National Park. It is located 134 km north of Bundaberg and 495 km north of Brisbane. It is owned and managed by Bush Heritage Australia, to which 450 ha of land was donated in 2004 by Michael and Dellarose Baevski.

== History ==
The coast of south-east Queensland is subject to extensive land clearing for residential and recreational development. In a cooperative partnership with a local developer, Sunrise@1770, part of the donated property is being used for environmentally-sensitive residential housing in order to fund the management and protection of the remainder, with no more than 2% of the entire site being cleared.

== Flora and fauna ==
The reserve contains open Corymbia woodland, Melaleuca forest, wallum heath communities, Pandanus-lined wetlands and cabbage palms. Recorded animal species of conservation significance include the beach stone-curlew, grey goshawk, delicate mouse and Dunmall's snake. A beach adjacent to the reserve is a breeding area for the endangered loggerhead turtle and will be managed by Bush Heritage.
