= Scottsdale (disambiguation) =

Scottsdale is a city in Arizona.

Scottsdale may also refer to:

- Scottsdale, Tasmania, Australia
- Scottsdale Reserve, New South Wales, Australia
- A former trim level for the Chevrolet C/K truck used from 1973 to 1998

== See also ==
- Scotsdale (disambiguation)
- Scottdale (disambiguation)
