= Burrin Burrin Reserve =

Protected area in New South Wales, Australia

- Location within New South Wales
- Location: New South Wales
- Coordinates: 35°22′40″S 149°38′38″E
- Area: 4.11 km^{2} (1.59 sq mi)
- Established: 1999
- Governing body: Bush Heritage Australia
- Website: http://www.bushheritage.org.au/our_reserves/state_new_south_wales/reserves_burrin

The Burrin Burrin Reserve is a privately owned nature reserve located in the upper reaches of the Shoalhaven River catchment in the Southern Tablelands region of southeastern New South Wales, Australia.

== Features ==
=== Landscape and vegetation ===
Burrin Burrin is situated in rugged country on the escarpment of the Great Dividing Range. The vegetation varies from tall, wet, eucalypt forest of ribbon gum and brown barrel on the higher ground down to more open forest of silver-top ash and woodlands of brittle gum.

=== Fauna ===
Mammal species present on Burrin Burrin include sugar and squirrel gliders as well as brushtail and ringtail possums. Bird species include the powerful owl and superb lyrebird.

== See also ==
- List of reduplicated Australian place names
- Protected areas of New South Wales
