= Gondwana Link =

Gondwana Link is one of the largest and most ambitious conservation projects proposed in Australia’s history.

Designed to protect and restore the ecological integrity of land areas across south-west Western Australia, a biodiversity hotspot, the completed link will be a continuous stretch of reconnected bushland stretching for a 1000 km from the wet forests in the State’s far southwest to the dry woodlands and shrublands bordering the Nullarbor Plain.

== History ==
Extensive agricultural clearing in parts of this region have led to fragmentation of the native ecosystems. But across the Gondwana Link pathway, much of the native bushland remains and this further supports the intentions of the Gondwana Link vision.

The Gondwana Link project began in 2002 as an informal coalition with the purchase of Chereninup Creek Reserve and other activities. It was not until 2012 that an incorporated body was formed with the establishment of Gondwana Link Inc. Operational areas are made up of eight major zones. In the Fitz-Stirling section of 'the Link' Greening Australia, Bush Heritage Australia, Fitzgerald Biosphere Group, Carbon Neutral and other private landholders and individuals are working together to reconnect the Stirling Range and Fitzgerald River National Parks, currently separated by only 70 km of mainly cleared land. About 2000 ha has been revegetated within this landscape.

Land acquisitions and conservation covenants aim to protect the most ecologically important and at-risk private lands, while restoration ecologists help assemble and apply the latest revegetation techniques to restore native bush habitats. The indigenous Noongar people are also providing support and input, informing all members of the cultural values of the country and sharing their knowledge and story of connection with the land.

Greening Australia has purchased or jointly purchased three properties between the National Parks (Nowanup, Beringa and Yarrabee) and has funded a large amount of direct seeding and tree planting on this land, including up to 650 ha undertaken with local farmers. Bush Heritage Australia has also purchased or jointly purchased three properties in this operational area, including the most recently purchased 'Monjebup North Reserve'. In addition to these two large not-for-profit, non-government-organisations, Carbon Neutral has recently purchased and revegetated a property, and conservation minded landholders are also purchasing and revegetating land in this landscape.

One broad aim of the Gondwana Link project is to recreate native vegetation systems that, as far as possible, reflect the original composition and structure of the native vegetation, a varied and diverse mosaic of vegetation associations which often has in excess of 350 plant species recorded per property.
