= Scottsdale Reserve =

Protected area in New South Wales, Australia

- Location within New South Wales
- Location: New South Wales
- Nearest city: Bredbo, New South Wales
- Coordinates: 35.9024°S 149.128°E
- Area: 13.28 km^{2} (5.13 sq mi)
- Established: 2006
- Governing body: Bush Heritage Australia
- Website: Official website

Scottsdale Reserve is a 1,328-hectare (3,280-acre) nature reserve on the Murrumbidgee River in south-central New South Wales, Australia. It is 79 kilometres (49 mi) south of Canberra, and 4 kilometres (2.5 mi) north of Bredbo. It is owned and managed by Bush Heritage Australia (BHA), which purchased it in 2006. The purchase was supportive of projects aiming to connect existing fragmented remnant habitat such as K2C (Kosciuszko to Coast). Since the 1870s up until 2006, the land was used for agriculture – primarily sheep grazing with some minor cropping. A significant component of the Reserve (around 25%) has been cleared of native vegetation (~300 Ha).

The reserve is within lands historically attributed to the Ngunawal people. Aboriginal presence in the area was likely due to the availability of resources such as the bogong moth (Argotis infusa) and the daisy yam (Microseris lanceolata). The Murrumbidgee River would have been a good source of fish including the trout cod (Maccullochhella macquariensis) – currently listed as endangered under the Environmental Protection and Biodiversity Conservation (EPBC) Act 1999. The river would have provided water for many species of terrestrial fauna the local Aboriginal people are known to have utilised for food including the brushtail possum (Trichosurus vulpecula), eastern grey kangaroo (Macropus gigantus) and the swamp wallaby (Wallabia bicolor).

== Biology and ecology ==
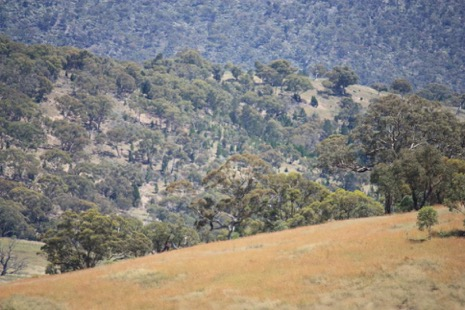
Typical landscape in Scottsdale Reserve

Scottsdale Reserve contains a diverse range of species including more than 217 plant species and 142 animal species including 113 bird species, primarily within two threatened communities:

1. Yellow box grassy woodlands (nationally critically endangered under the EPBC Act 1999); and
2. Natural temperate grassland (nationally critically endangered under the EPBC Act 1999).

Other vegetation communities found on the reserve include:

- Scribbly gum-black cypress pine forest; and
- Tablelands frost hollow grassy woodlands.

=== Flora ===
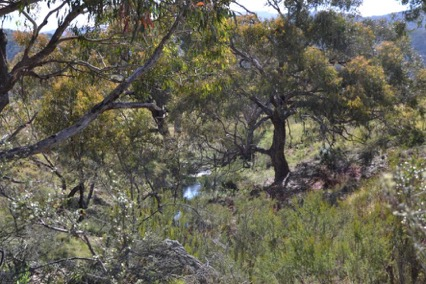
Typical Scottsdale flora in a small gully

An extensive ecosystem restoration program is underway at Scottsdale with a nursery on site propagating plants including grasses such as river tussock (Poa labillardierei), shrubs such as the silver wattle (Acacia dealbata) and trees including yellowbox (Eucalyptus melliodora). In addition to propagating the more common species expected to be present in the vegetation communities mentioned above, Scottsdale is host to the silver-leafed mountain gum (Eucalyptus pulverulenta). Only ten natural populations of the silver-leafed mountain gum are thought to still exist in Australia and it has been listed as vulnerable to extinction. The Scottsdale team have obtained licenses and intend to propagate this species while in the process of identifying suitable sites.

==== Natural temperate grassland ====
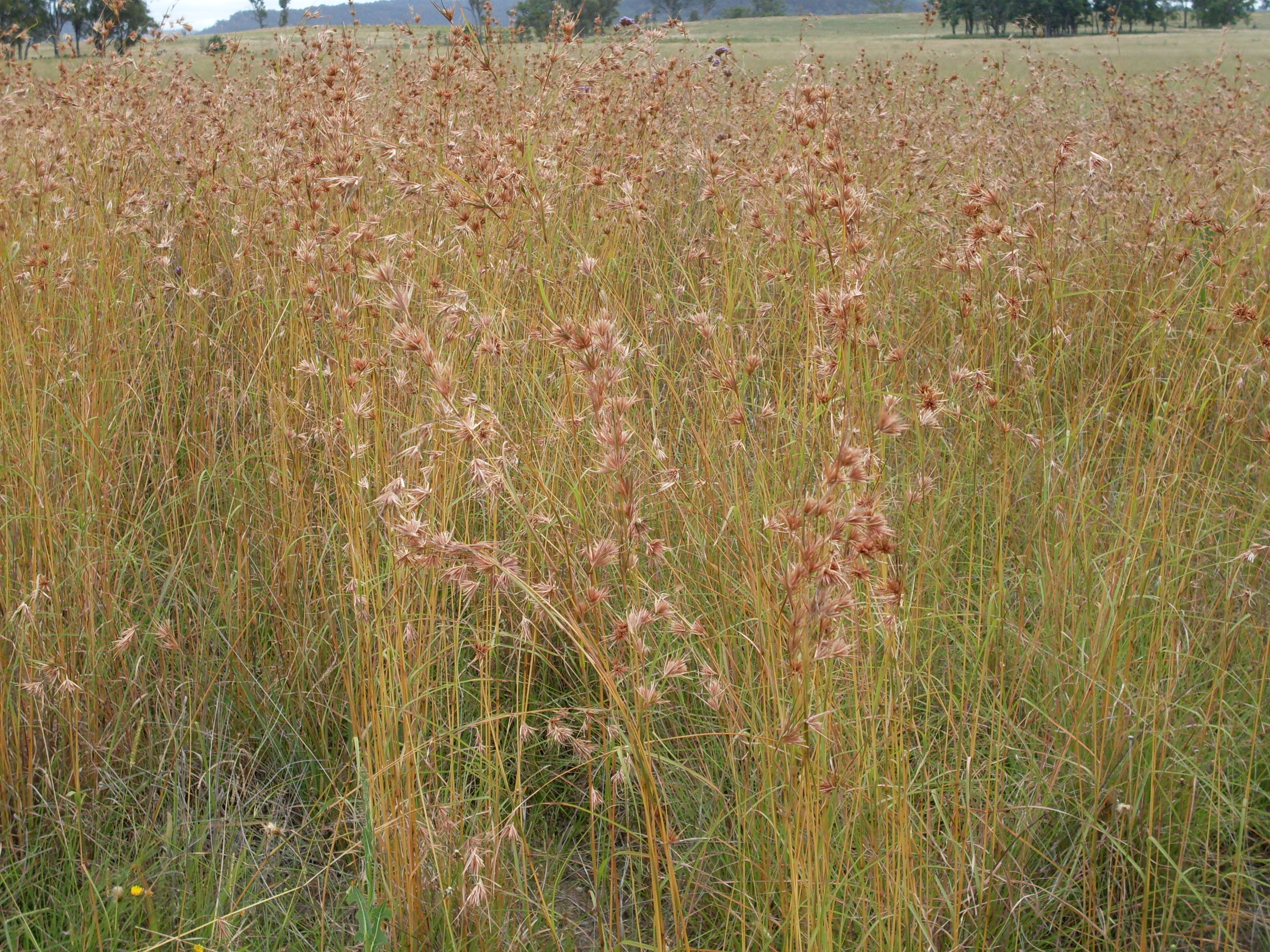
Kangaroo grass

The southern tablelands of the ACT and NSW contained around 480,000 hectares of native grasslands prior to European settlement. There is less than 3% of that original area today unaffected by the changes settlers brought including land clearing, grazing and invasive plants. Other impacts that graziers have had on natural grasslands include changes to soil chemistry resulting from the use of fertilisers, habitat fragmentation and changes in microbial processes.

Natural temperate grassland is characterised by native perennial tussock grasses such as kangaroo grass (Themeda triandra syn. T. australis), snowgrass (Poa sieberiana) and river tussock grass (Poa labillardierei), together with speargrass species (Austrostipa sp.), wallaby grasses (Austrodanthonia sp.) and wild sorghum (Sorghum leiocladum).

Approximately 90 Hectares of Scottsdale Reserve originally contained natural temperate grassland. The original grassland was found beside the Gungoandra Creek along a chain of ponds and frost hollows. Managing the weeds prior to restoration is a challenge, with techniques including the application of herbicide, soil scraping and burning being utilised to reduce the seedbank prior to seeding. In April 2014, 11 different native grasses and 30 different wildflowers were direct seeded into isolated trial areas. After 7 months, surveys showed that desirable plants were germinating at an average of 80 plants per square metre and seed was spreading into adjoining areas of Scottsdale Reserve.

==== Yellow box grassy woodlands ====
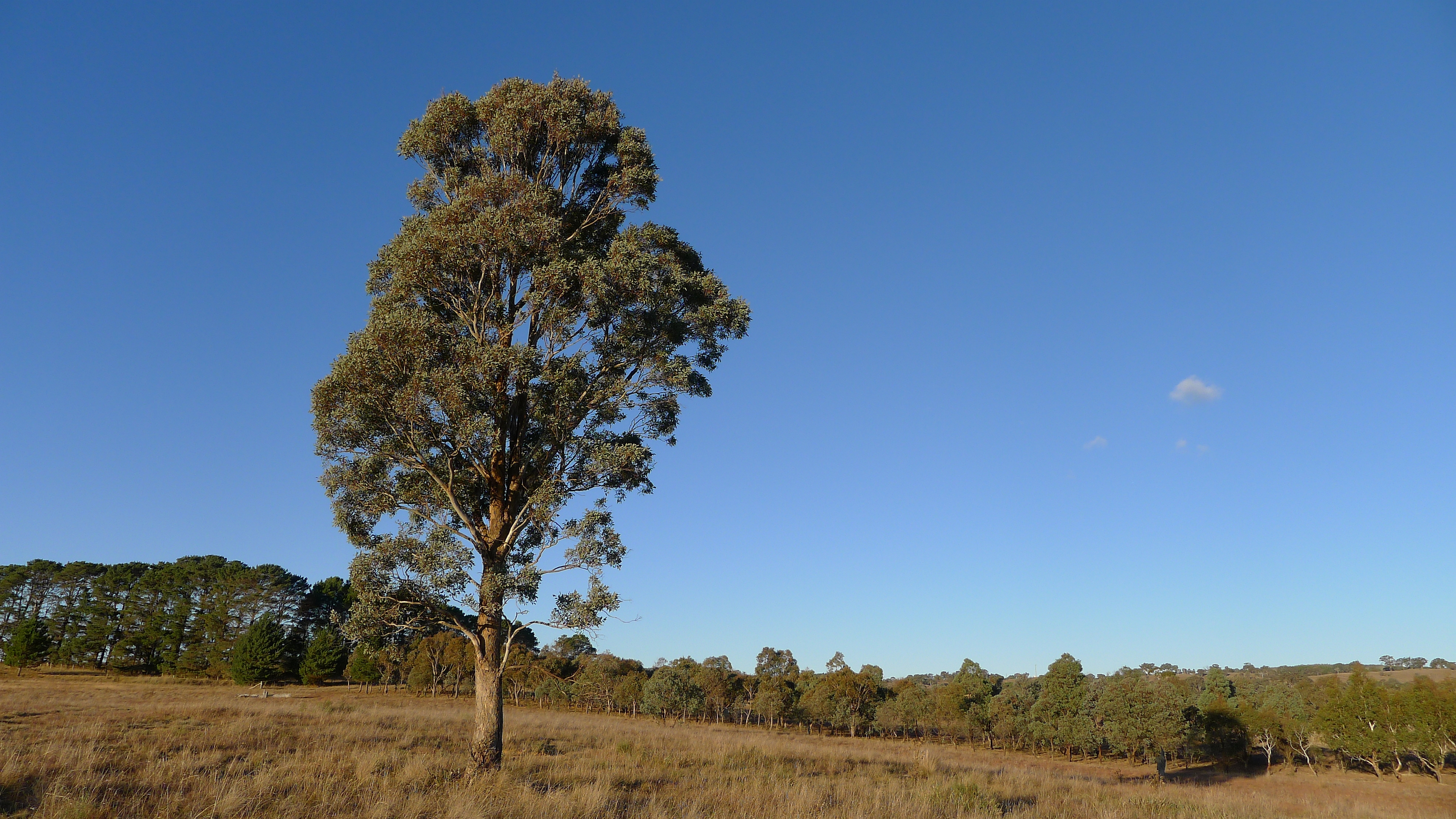
Yellow box

In New South Wales, grassy box woodlands are characterised in the over-storey by distinct Eucalypt species that change with diminishing rainfall the further one travels from the coast. In the tablelands where Scottsdale Reserve is situated, the dominant eucalypts in grassy box woodlands are yellow box (Eucalyptus melliodora) and red gum (Eucalyptus blakelyi). The mid-storey consists of sparse shrubs from the Grevillea, Acacia and Cassinia families while the ground layer consists of grasses and herbaceous plants.

Prior to European arrival, millions of hectares in NSW was covered in grassy box woodlands, today less than 10% remains. The impacts of clearing for agriculture have resulted in fragmentation of the remnant vegetation, leading to efforts in conservation focussing on providing corridors linking these fragments.

A large amount of cleared former yellow box grassy woodland is now covered in African lovegrass (Eragrostis curvula) throughout the Monaro. The team at Scottsdale and a host of volunteers have planted 20,000 tube-stock plants from the critically endangered vegetation community in a trial to shade out the lovegrass. The team are trialling different methods of restoration ecology in an attempt to understand methods that will best suit the Reserve.

Natural tree regeneration in Australian agricultural landscapes of species such as Eucalyptus and Allocasuarina has historically been low. Higher historical levels of agricultural activity such as cultivation, grazing and degraded land being invaded by weeds tend to lead to less natural regeneration of eucalypt species and other desired vegetation from the threatened communities. Grazing intensity appears to be the primary determinant of Eucalyptus regenerative success as changes to the seedbed occur due to pasture grass introductions and seedlings are often browsed by either stock or pests reducing their survival rate. In areas without stock access, the abundance of young eucalypt plants can be up to three orders of magnitude greater than sites where stock have regular access. In the 18 months up to April 2015, more than 4,000 yellow and white box eucalypt plantings at Scottsdale were experiencing survival rates of 96.5%. This level of success can be attributed to the absence of stock in paddocks where the plantings have been implemented and the use of sturdy tree guards to help reduce pest browsing by animals such as the swamp wallaby (Wallabia bicolor) and rabbits.

==== Murrumbidgee riparian corridor ====
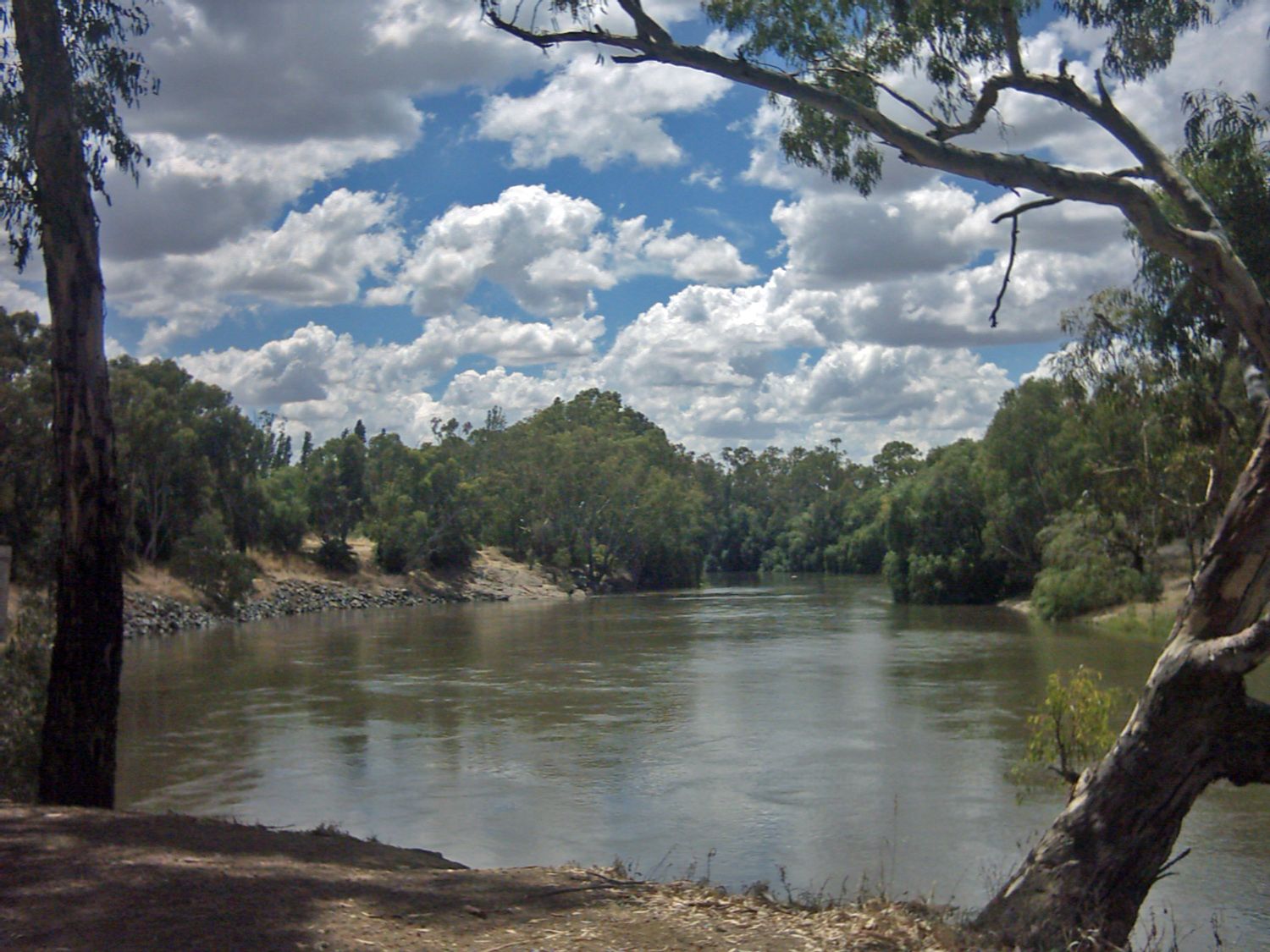
Murrumbidgee River (Irrigation peak)

Scottsdale in conjunction with the Upper Murrumbidgee Demonstration Reach have planted a 6 km habitat corridor between Bredbo and the Colinton Gorge. This corridor will improve the habitat for the threatened Murray cod, Macquarie perch and trout cod. Trials of long-stem planting in the riparian verge of species such as Eucalyptus viminalis, in conjunction with 17,000 Poa labillardierei are underway. Areas along the riparian corridor that have been less intensively grazed host a greater abundance and variety of shrubs from the grassy box woodlands community. Increasing the abundance of shrubs is an important component of creating a more complex vegetation structure that will support a wider variety and abundance of bird species.

Most of the riparian zone along the Murrumbidgee is privately owned land. Stock access to water along the Murrumbidgee has had a particularly severe impact on the vegetation and habitat through trampling, grazing and erosion. While fencing can be erected in an attempt to control stock access, native herbivores such as kangaroos and wallabies cause as much damage as stock and are relatively unaffected by fencing.

=== Fauna ===
Scottsdale Reserve is home to a number of different animals – some native and some exotic. Threatened species include Rosenberg's monitor (Varanus rosenbergi), the speckled warbler (Pyrrholaemus sagittatus), brown treecreeper (Climacteris picumnus), Macquarie perch (Macquaria australasica) and striped legless lizard (Delma impar). The latter two species have specific conservation programs underway at Scottsdale.

==== Macquarie perch (Macquaria australasica) ====
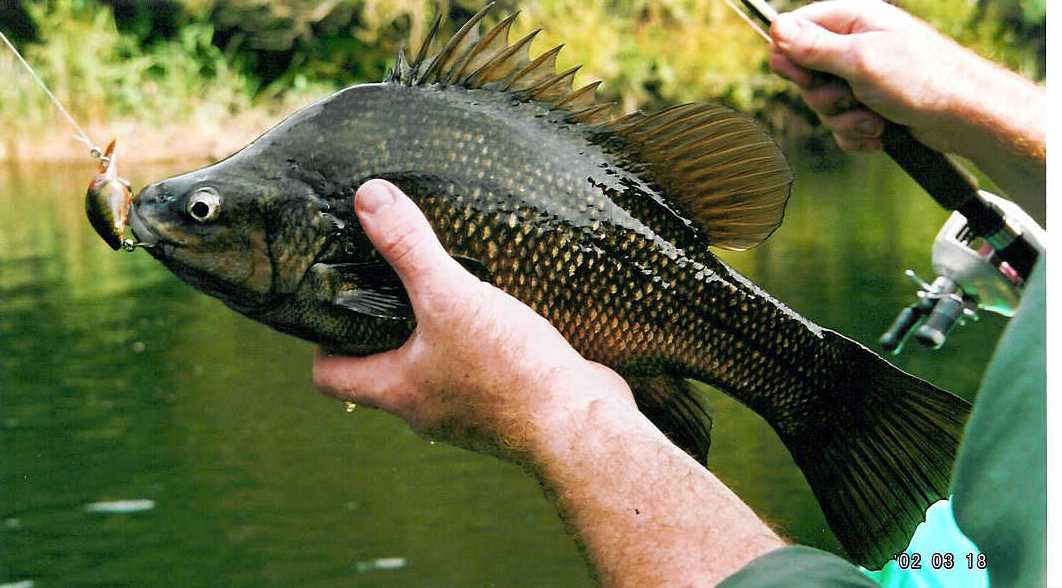
Macquarie perch

The Macquarie perch is one of three threatened fish species found in the Upper Murrumbidgee River alongside Murray cod (Maccullochella peelii) and trout cod (Maccullochella macquariensis). This Australian native freshwater fish is endemic to the south eastern component of the Murray-Darling River System and prefers clear, flowing water. In the 1970s the species was observed to be declining in abundance with a contracting range and this eventually led to a listing of nationally endangered under the EPBC Act 1999. Today, physical barriers such as dams and the distance between small populations that are geographically dispersed increase the extinction threat.

Researchers from the University of Canberra are currently working to protect this species together with the team at Scottsdale through the identification of spawning areas (utilising underwater listening posts and acoustic tags) which can then be analysed to help understand factors affecting recruitment. Fishing is a factor often attributed to the decline in the Macquarie perch fish stocks, however evidence suggests that environmental factors such as altered hydrological flows and predation by carp have a far greater influence.

==== Striped legless lizard (Delma impar) ====
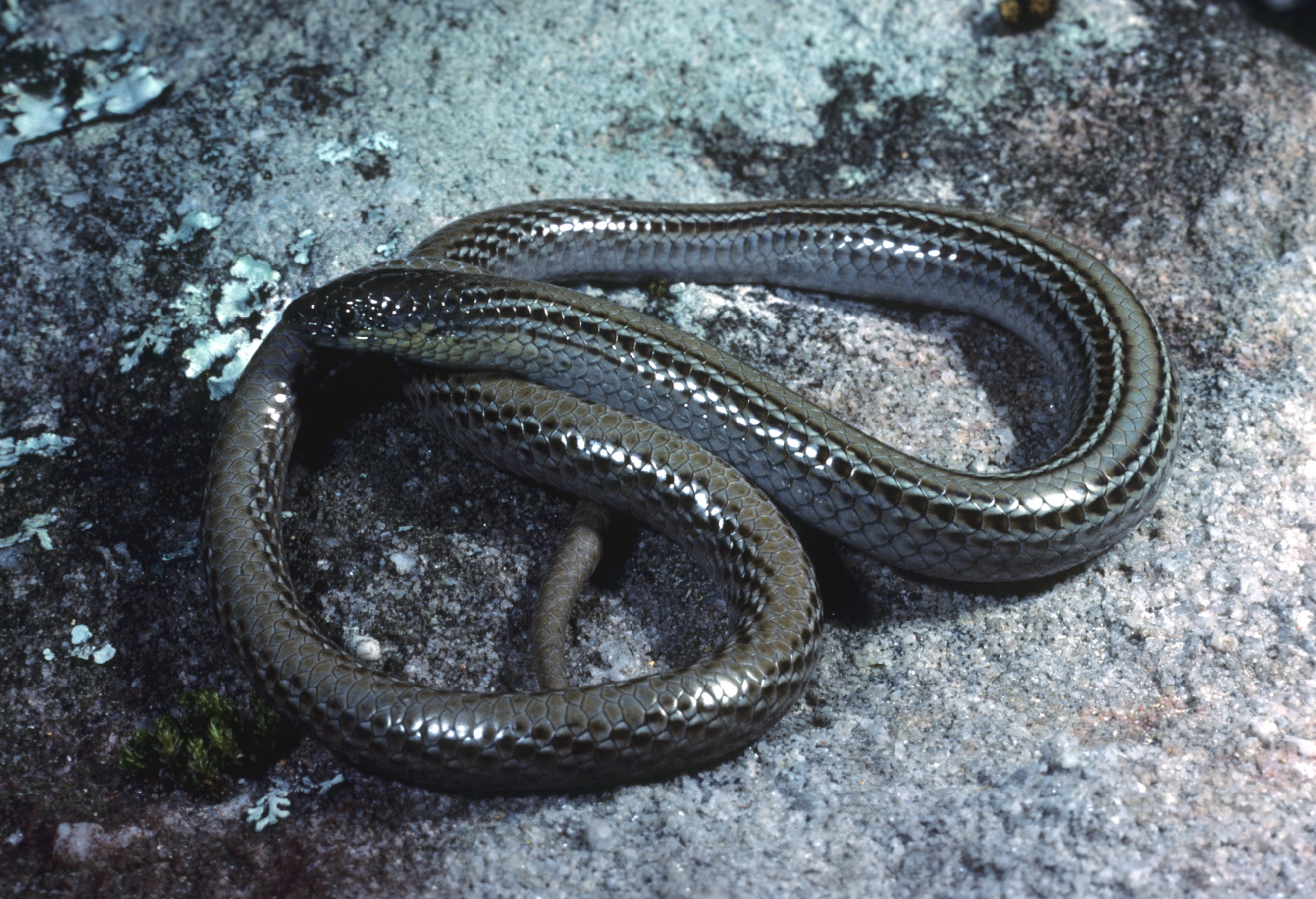
CSIRO ScienceImage 6661 striped legless lizard

The striped legless lizard prefers undisturbed primary native grasslands with dense cover of tussock grasses such as kangaroo grass (Themeda triandra). Suburban development leading to habitat fragmentation and extensive agricultural impact on both native vegetation and soils have contributed to the decline of suitable habitat for Delma impar. Only around 3% of undisturbed temperate grasslands (suitable habitat for Delma impar) are estimated to remain in south eastern Australia. Delma impar seeks cover from tussock grasses to help maintain its body temperature and moisture requirements. Habitat selection is also driven by predator avoidance (such as raptors) and the abundance of invertebrate food sources. A key conservation challenge in managing populations of this threatened lizard has been maintaining genetic diversity, as the habitat is highly fragmented and populations are relatively small.

One of the management actions at Scottsdale is supporting the relocation of a number of vulnerable striped legless lizards (Delmar impar) from development sites in Canberra. Trial areas were fenced prior to relocating the lizards whose original habitat prior to the advent of agriculture was natural treeless grasslands. Following human disturbance, the threatened lizard has a restricted range existing in fragmented secondary grasslands (where trees have been removed) in temperate areas of south eastern Australia.

==== Trout cod (Maccullochella macquariensis) ====
Trout cod have been grown in a hatchery and introduced to the Murrumbidgee River near Narrandera in an attempt to build stocks of this threatened fish. While this is a common approach to increasing the stock of threatened fish species, survival rates can often be low due to the fish displaying domesticated behavioural traits. Greater success was experienced with the translocation of wild trout cod where greater numbers of individuals were present (tracked using radio telemetry) after 12 months (more than 60% of the wild fish survived while less than 10% of the hatchery fish were present).

== Environmental threats ==
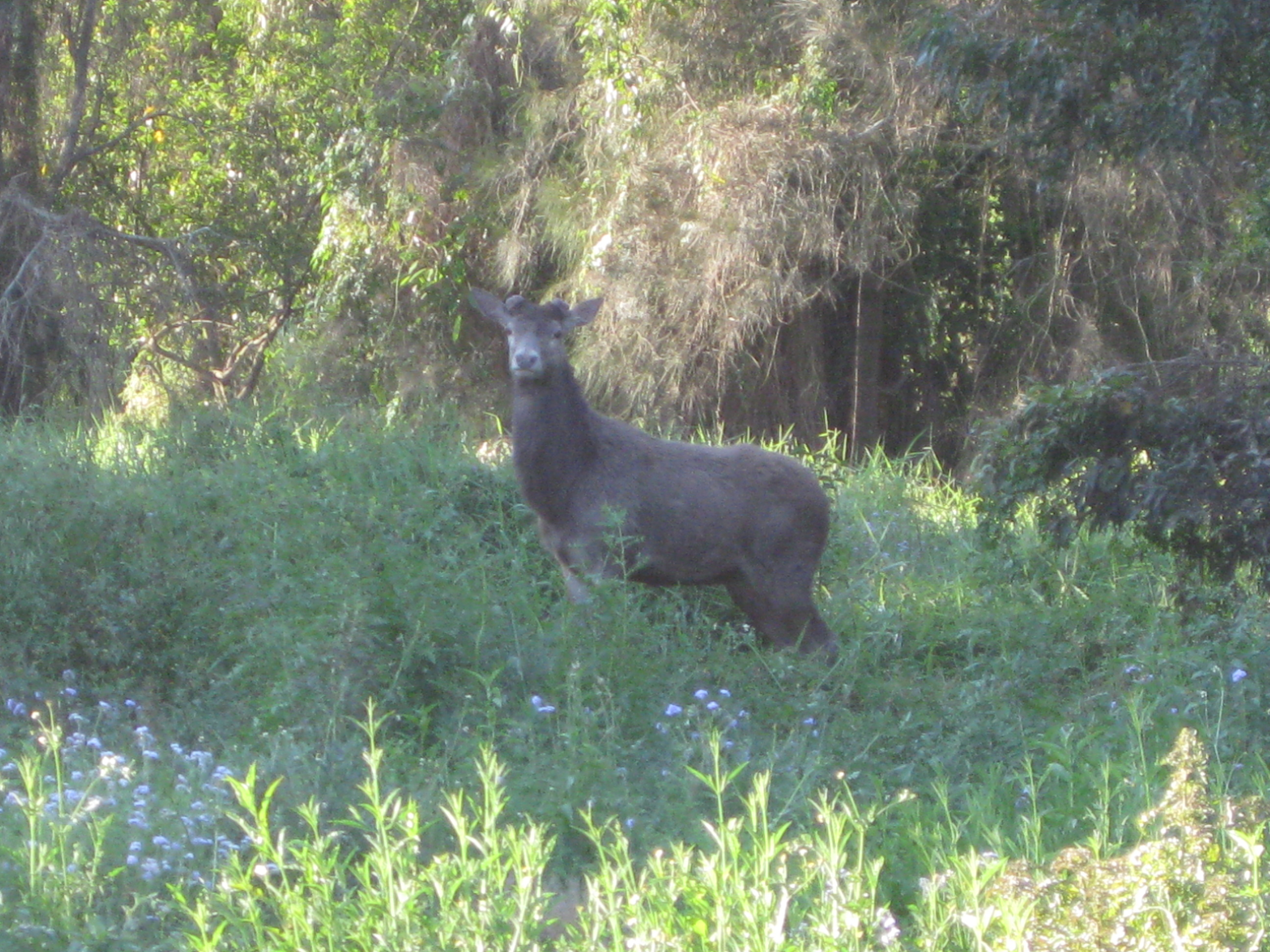
Feral deer at 2MT planting site (8069319548)

Management actions at Scottsdale are directed at reducing environmental threats in order to help protect the threatened ecosystems and species mentioned above. Threats include:

- Feral grazing and predation from pigs, deer, rabbits, cats, carp and foxes. Management actions include trapping and baiting.
- Invasive weeds such as African lovegrass, serrated tussock, st johns wort and briar rose – management actions have historically utilised herbicide, although new methods are currently being trialled.
- Erosion – management actions include the construction of leaky weirs, flumes and establishing vegetative ground cover.

=== European rabbits (Oryctolagus cuniculus) ===
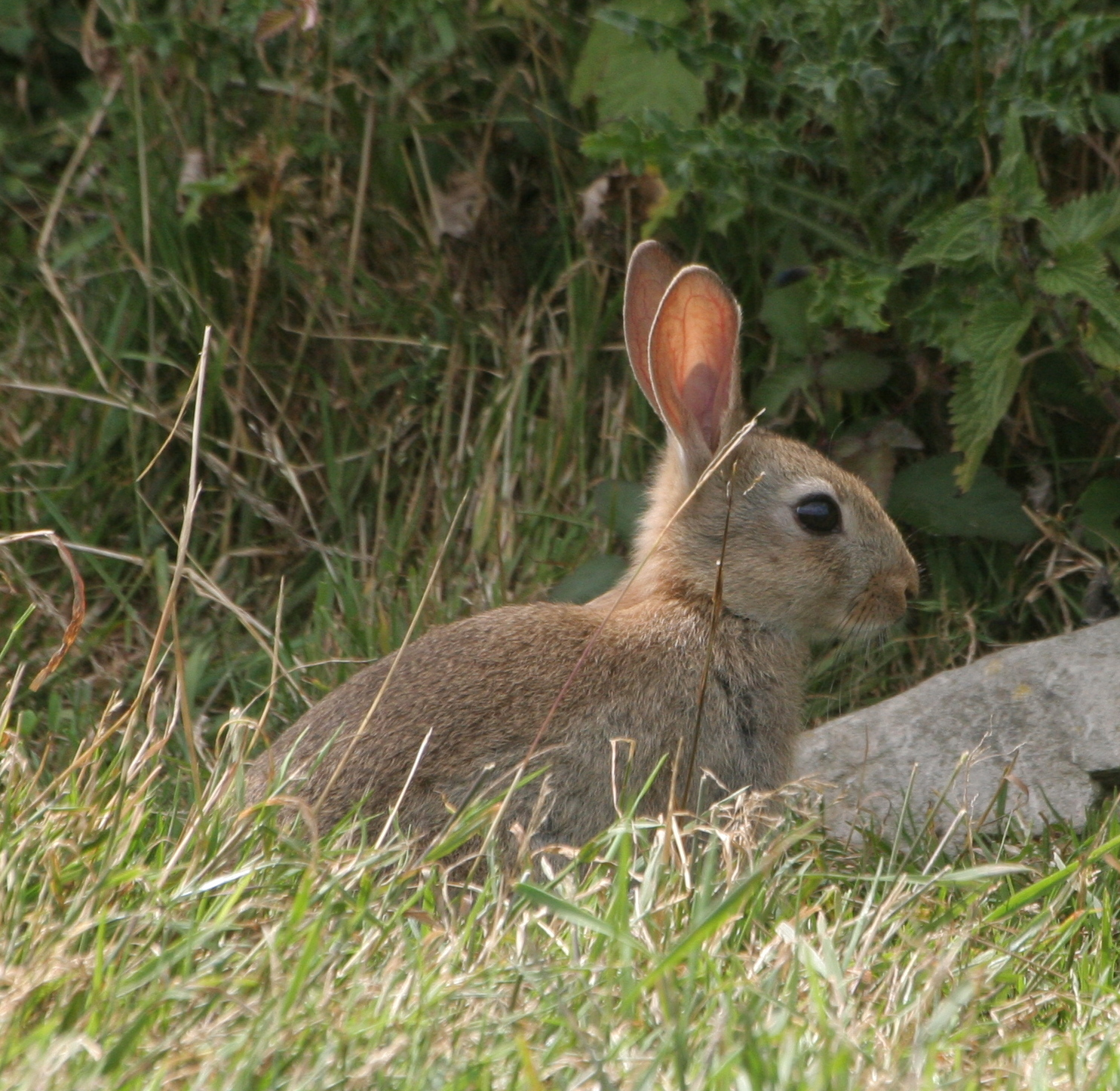
Young wild rabbit

European rabbits were introduced to Australia in 1788 as part of the settlement associated with the First Fleet and rapidly established themselves as a serious vertebrate pest. Rabbits create warrens, or a series of burrows in the soil that leads to extensive soil disturbance in the near vicinity. Weeds tend to flourish in the disturbed soils associated with warren diggings at the expense of native vegetation. Rabbits will graze extensively, removing native vegetation and degrading the landscape. They have a significant impact on shrub recruitment unless suitable guards are in place which can be an expensive means of protecting new growth.

Scottsdale maintains an active program to help reduce the threat of rabbits. Since volunteers at Scottsdale have been inspecting and baiting warrens every 3 months, active rabbit sites have reduced from nearly 60% of 320 identified warrens to around 20%.

=== African lovegrass (Eragrostis curvula) ===
The most serious environmental weed on the property is African lovegrass – which has invaded much of the previously cleared pasture land and forms monocultures in many similar locations in the Kosciuszko to Coast management areas in south eastern NSW. This weed is highly invasive, choking out native growth in degraded soils and changing the fire behaviour of an area potentially transforming the ecosystem. In addition, the subdivision of large rural lands into smaller properties that are often bought by people with little weed knowledge is exacerbating an already severe problem through their lack of effective action.

=== Carp (Cyprinus carpio) ===
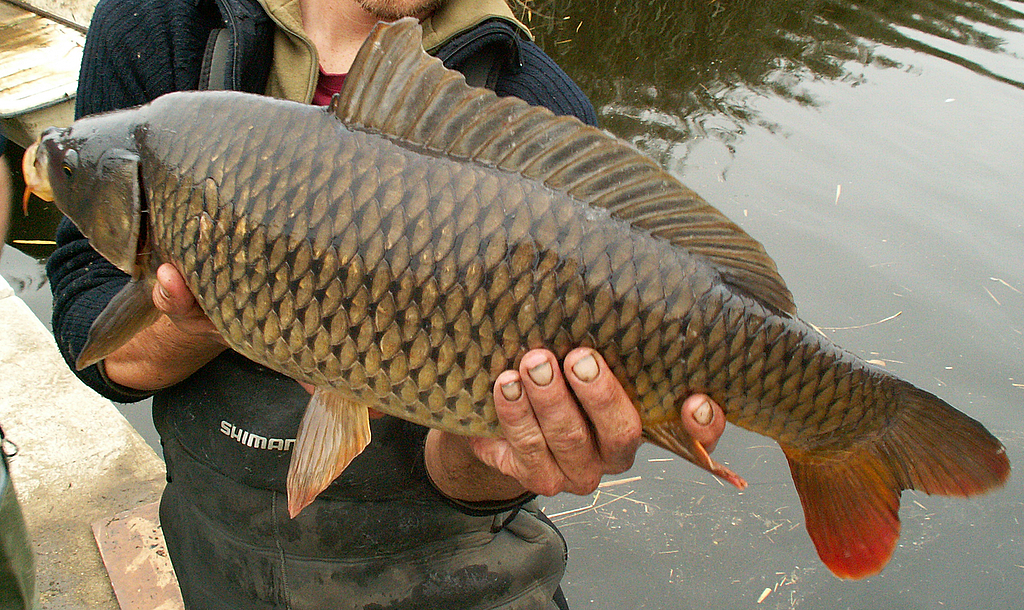
Feral carp

The common carp (Cyprinus carpio) was introduced to Australia around 150 years ago and has since become the dominant fish in the Murray Darling Basin, forming up to 90% of the fish biomass. The carp is highly invasive, and is considered a pest in most Australian states due to a vast appetite for predation and its ability to recruit in hydrologically altered waterways where native fish often have a need for greater current variability. Bush Heritage Australia, together with the Upper Murrumbidgee Demonstration Reach is conducting research in an attempt to better deal with this pest. The research includes tracking the carp using acoustic telemetry and trapping – to remove the carp but also to help estimate population numbers and identify breeding and gathering locations.

== Management ==
BHA maintain 5 main management objectives for the ecosystems on Reserve:

1. Cleared box woodland areas – restored with yellow box and associated species by 2030;
2. Valley floor – increase native grassland by 20% by 2030, while protecting remnant vegetation;
3. Restore habitat in the Murrumbidgee riparian and in-stream zones by 2020;
4. Stabilise Gungoandra Creek and tributary gullies by 2030; and
5. Dry sclerophyll forest areas – will support priority species of flora and fauna by 2030.

In order to deliver against these objectives, Scottsdale Reserve hosts a large number of volunteers who undertake activities such as large scale planting in the previously cleared valley, propagation in the in-house nursery and weed control in remnant vegetation.
