= Nameless Sylvan Reserve =

Protected area in New South Wales, Australia

- IUCN category II (national park)
- Location within New South Wales
- Location: New South Wales
- Nearest city: Berry, New South Wales
- Coordinates: 34.7300°S 150.7412°E
- Area: 54 ha (130 acres)
- Established: 2007
- Governing body: Bush Heritage Australia
- Website: Official website

Nameless Sylvan Reserve is a 54-hectare (130-acre) nature reserve on the Illawarra Escapment of south-eastern New South Wales, Australia. It is 10 kilometres (6.2 mi) north of Berry, and close to the Barren Grounds Nature Reserve. It is owned and managed by Bush Heritage Australia (BHA), to which it was donated in 2007 by Louise Sylvan.

== Landscape and biota ==
The property is steeply sloped, with Irwin's Creek flowing through the reserve; the lower part protects a scarce remnant of Illawarra subtropical rainforest, while the higher part holds temperate rainforest. Plant species include the giant stinging tree, red cedar and brush bloodwood, as well as various kinds of figs. The principal management needs are the control of weeds and feral animals.

From the animal world, freshwater crayfish, platypus and swamp wallabies can be found here.
