= Flying Fox Pass =

- Coordinates: 34°40′31″S 150°41′43″E

Flying Fox Pass is a locality in the Barren Grounds Nature Reserve in New South Wales, Australia, overlooking the Kangaroo Valley. It is the site of a former flying fox cablecar which lifted valuable timber from the valley to be transported by road and rail systems. Little remains of the flying fox, just a cement plinth and rusted remnants of the wire and winching equipment. A walking track extends to the pass, but dense vegetation growth precludes any vista from the site.
