= Goonderoo Reserve =

Protected area in Queensland, Australia

- Location within Queensland
- Location: Queensland
- Nearest city: Emerald, Queensland
- Coordinates: 23.869°S 148.146°E
- Area: 1,801 ha (6.95 sq mi)
- Established: 1998
- Governing body: Bush Heritage Australia
- Website: Official website

Goonderoo Reserve is a nature reserve on Western Kangoulu Country in the Brigalow belt of Queensland, Australia. It is located 40 km south of Emerald, 300 km west of Rockhampton and 835 km north-west of Brisbane. It is owned and managed by the nature conservation charity Bush Heritage Australia.

== History ==
The Brigalow belt of Queensland is subject to extensive land-clearing. Goonderoo was on the market and likely to be cleared for agriculture. Its purchase by Bush Heritage reflected the need to conserve representative examples of Brigalow belt ecosystems.

In the original 593 ha reserve was expanded to 1801 ha with the purchase and incorporation of the adjacent Avocet Station which has a colony of the endangered bridled nailtail wallaby.

== Flora and fauna ==
The reserve contains semi-arid, tropical, open forests, woodlands and savanna. The commonest tree species is brigalow, but there are several other vegetation associations. Bird species of conservation significance include the squatter pigeon, Australian bustard, barking owl and speckled warbler. Mammals recorded include the koala, bridled nailtail wallaby and northern brown bandicoot. Bilbies used to occur on the property.
