= Neville Bonney =

Australian ethnobotanist and author (born 1939)

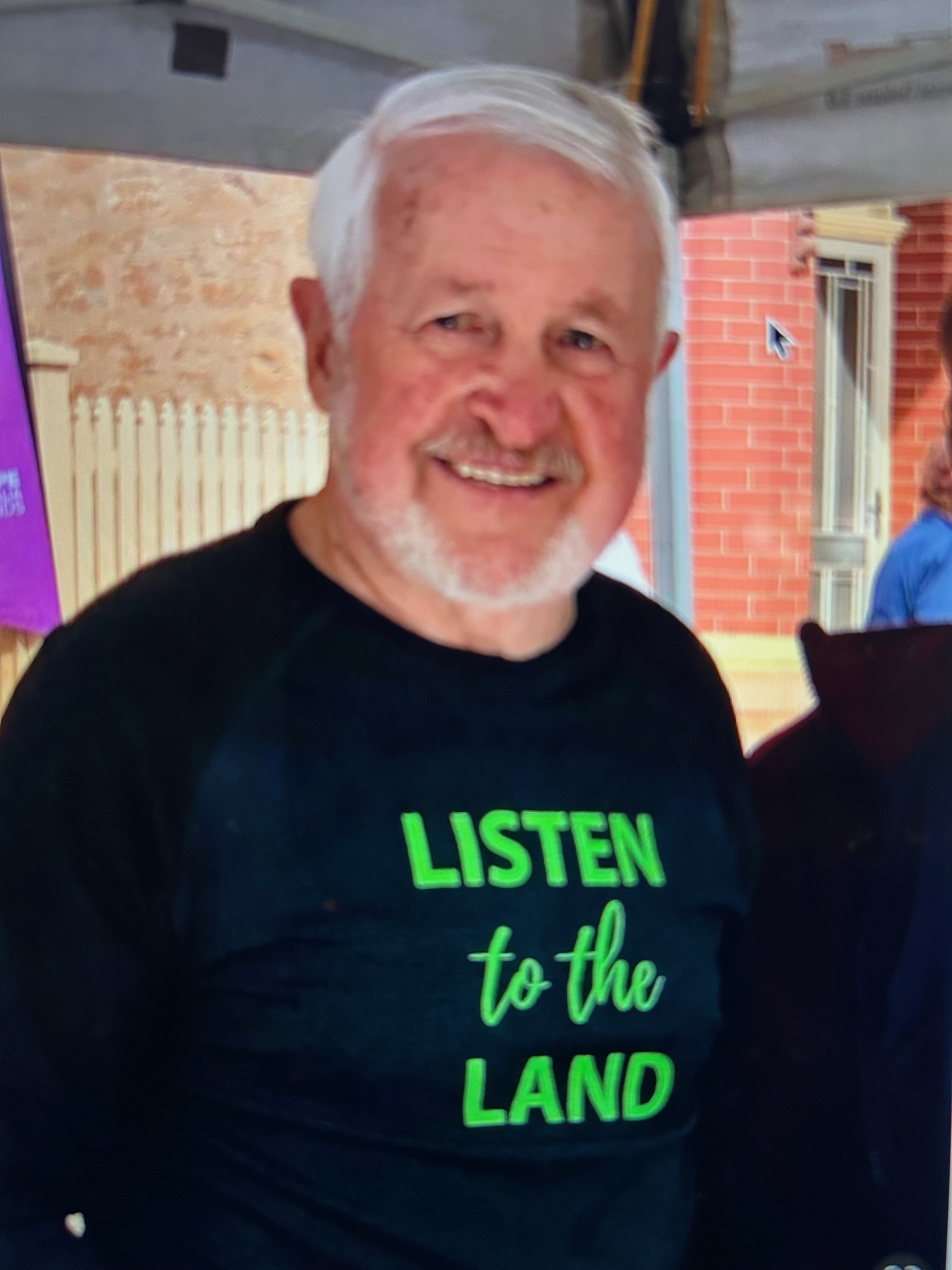
Neville Bonney in 2022

Neville B. Bonney OAM (born in 1939) is a South Australian pioneering native plant expert, ethnobotanist and published author of some 20 texts on Australian native plants (see bibliography).

A seed collector, plant propagator and has previously owned and operated a native plant nursery, he has extensive knowledge in farming plants for timber, flowers, wild foods, firewood and other purposes.

In 2021 he published From One Small Seed a Forest Is Born, a comprehensive guide to Australian native plants and their seeds, covering more than 700 species from 63 families and 240 genera.

His most recent book Treasures from the Australian Bush, was published in 2026 and focused on economically useful native Australian plants.

Bonney is an advocate for the commercialisation of "useful" indigenous flora, including wattleseed and has promoted the production and development of markets for "bush foods" in Australia and beyond.

In 2023 Bonney was a recipient of the South Australian Environment Awards Lifetime Achiever, and in February 2024 he was featured in Indaily in an article covering his life and work.

In 2026 Bonney was awarded an OAM for his service to conservation and the environment, and to the community.

As an in-demand speaker and educator, Neville continues to engage community across the country on seed collection, local plant identification, and commercial and traditional uses for native plants

== Bibliography ==
Title	Role	Publisher	Year	ISBN
The Tantanoola tiger	Author	Lynton Publications	1976	0869462326
An introduction to the identification of native flora in the lower south east of South Australia	Author	South East Community College, Dept. of Further Education	1977	0724391088
Tantanoola 1879-1979	Co-author	The South Eastern Times	1979	0959543600
Trees of the south-east of South Australia : a sketchbook for identification	Author	Institute of Foresters, South Eastern Branch	1982	
Carpenter Rocks and beyond	Author	Neville Bonney	1987	0731614879
Common plants of the Coorong	Author	Pioneer Design Studio	1988	0731662873
Seeding for tomorrow's forest	Author	Greening Australia	1992	
Common plants of the Flinders Ranges	Author		1993	0646154060
What seed is that? : a field guide to the identification, collection and germination of native seed in South Australia	Author	Greening Australia	1994	0646198203
Native plant uses of Southern South Australia	Author	South East Book Promotions Group	1994	0646180924
Direct seeding native vegetation on various soil types within South Australia : a report and recommendations	Co-author	Greening Australia	1995	
A greener South Australia : a report on trees and shrubs established in South Australia between 1989 and 1995	Author	Greening Australia	1996	
Economic native trees and shrubs for South Australia	Author	Greening Australia	1997	0646331531
Common native plants of the Coorong region : identification, propagation, historical uses	Author	Australian Plants Society	2004	0646442074
Australian seeds : a guide to their collection, identification and biology	Author	CSIRO Publishing	2006	9780643092983
The effect of sowing season on the reliability of direct seeding	Author	Rural Industries Research and Development Corporation	2007	1741515025
Adnyamathanha and beyond : useful plants of an ancient land	Author	Australian Plants Society	2007	9780980301304
The Rocks : les Charpentiers	Co-author	Leonie O'Meara	2009	9780646508665
Knowing growing eating : edible wild native plants for southern Australia	Author	Neville Bonney	2010	9780646544106
What native plant is that? : Identifying and growing native vegetation in the south east of South Australia	Author	South East Natural Resources Management Board	2010	9780646529592
Jewel of the Australian desert: native peach (quandong); the tree with the round red fruit	Author	Neville Bonney	2013	9780646911045
Sheoaks. Wind Harps from the Desert to the Sea	Author	Neville Bonney	2016	9780646960371
Knowing, Growing Acacia for Food and Conservation	Author	Neville Bonney	2018	9780648390030
From One Small Seed - A Forest is Born	Author	Neville Bonney	2021	9780648390039
Ancient Flora ot the Northern Flinders Ranges	Author	Neville Bonney	2023	9780645870831
Treasures from the Australian Bush	Author	Neville Bonney	2026	9781764539364
