= Wildflower Society of Western Australia =

Natural history organisation in Western Australia

The Wildflower Society of Western Australia (Inc.) (WSWA) is a member of the Australian Native Plants Society (Australia) (ANPSA(A)). In each of the other states of Australia, there is a region of the ANPS(A) (each with slightly differing names) and they share many of the aims of the WSWA.

== Objectives ==
The objectives of the WSWA are: (a) To encourage the conservation and preservation of Western Australian flora by, among other things, supporting efforts to strengthen laws and regulations for the conservation of Western Australian flora, encouraging enforcement of laws and regulations and making submissions on the preservation of Western Australian flora to government and other organisations. (b) To raise public awareness about the value of, and need to conserve, bushland. (c) The Society will establish and maintain a public fund to be called The Wildflower Society Bushland Conservation Fund for the specific purpose of supporting the environmental objects/purposes of the Wildflower Society of Western Australia (Inc.). The Fund is established to receive all gifts of money or property for this purpose and any money received because of such gifts must be credited to its bank account. The Fund must not receive any other money or property into its account and it must comply with subdivision 30-E of the Income Tax Assessment Act 1997. (d) To promote the cultivation of Western Australian flora in home gardens and public areas. (e) To promote the study of Western Australian flora and to keep records of information on growing methods and the performance of such plants under cultivation. (f) To support the establishment and operation of Branches within the state of Western Australia.

== Fund ==
The Society has a fund for the:

- conservation of bushland;
- raising public awareness of bushland;
- called The Wildflower Society Bushland Conservation Fund.

== History ==
Interest in the flora of Western Australia (WA) began not long after European settlement in 1829. On 26 January 1884 the Natural History Society petitioned the state government 'to set apart a reserve for protection of the indigenous fauna and flora' and in February 1894 the Pinjarra Reserve was gazetted. In 1907 the Natural History Society again petitioned the state government of the day for Pinjarra Reserve to be vested as a National Park.

- 1912 – Western Australian Floral Birthday book by Constance Miller
- Post World War I – Dr W.E. Blackall's work and publications on knowing Western Australia's wildflowers.
- 1921 – Wildflowers of Western Australia, an illustrated book by E.H. Pelloe.

There was considerable national interest in the nation's native flora and on 12 March 1957 the inaugural meeting of Society for Growing Australian Plants (SGAP) was held in Melbourne, Victoria. Arthur Swaby who spearheaded a national approach in the interest of native flora, visited all states. This led to the inaugural meeting for what was later to become WSWA, being held on 18 March 1958, at Applecross, WA to form the Regional Council of the SGAP. Those present (the WSWA's founding "fathers") were:

- Mrs Spence, Mr Les O'Grady, Mrs R Roe, Mr and Mrs Mount, Mrs Hargraves, Mrs Hart, Mr and Mrs Lullfitz, Mr and Mrs Gray,
- Mrs Fawcett, the Misses King, Mr Chambers, Mrs Taylor, Miss Nan Harper, Mrs Strickland, Mrs de la Hunty, Miss Sue Harper, and Mrs J. Hamersley.

Thus in 1958 the Regional Council of the Society for Growing Australian Plants for Western Australia was formed, and in 1962 it changed its name to Western Australian Wildflower Growers Society. There was another name change in 1964 to the Western Australian Wildflower Society (Inc.) and finally in 1990 the name was changed to today's nomenclature: Wildflower Society of Western Australia (Inc.). The Society was one of four organisations that assisted in the formation of the Conservation Council of Western Australia in 1967.

== Today ==
The WSWA today has some 700 members. A shared wonder of Western Australia's flora has brought together professional and amateur botanists and interested enthusiasts.

The aims of WSWA are to understand Western Australia's plants, to share information on how to recognise them, to protect the bushland in which they grow, and to propagate and grow them. WSWA operates as an "umbrella" organisation: all members are automatically members of all branches. There are a number of branches in the Perth region: Armadale, Darling Range, Eastern Hills, Murdoch, Northern Suburbs and Perth as well as in the country: Avon, Albany, Kulin, Merredin and South West Capes. The branches meet and undertake activities that include seed and plant conservation, WA native plant growing, tours, flora surveys and voluntary work at their local and the State's herbaria. A general Management Committee services the whole society with committees including Conservation, Garden matters and the Bushland Conservation Fund.

The society publishes a quarterly newsletter which lists the activities of the branches as well as providing articles on topics associated with wildflowers. In addition, members may choose to receive the full colour quarterly Australian Plants. This is a national publication focusing on plant identification and propagation.

From time to time, members work with Government Departments such as the Department of Environment and Conservation, especially the WA Herbarium, The Department of Environmental Protection, and Kings Park and Botanic Garden.

== See also ==
- Gardening in Australia
