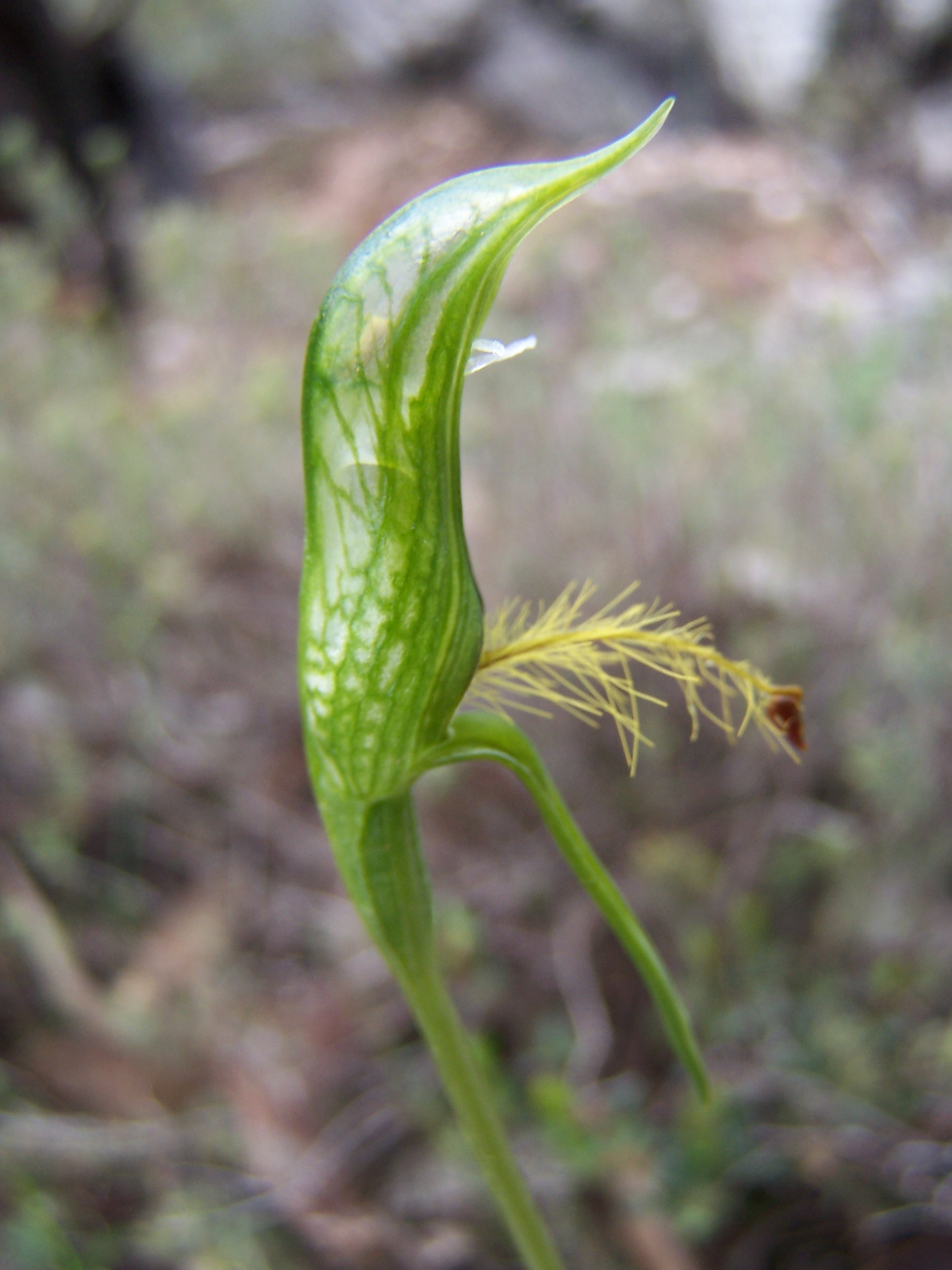

Scientific classification
- Kingdom: Plantae
- Clade: Tracheophytes
- Clade: Angiosperms
- Clade: Monocots
- Order: Asparagales
- Family: Orchidaceae
- Subfamily: Orchidoideae
- Tribe: Cranichideae
- Genus: Pterostylis
- Species: P. plumosa

Binomial name
- Pterostylis plumosa Cady

Synonyms
- Plumatichilos plumosa (Cady) Szlach.

= Pterostylis plumosa =

Bearded greenhood

Species of orchid

Pterostylis plumosa, commonly known as the bearded greenhood or plumed greenhood is a species of orchid in the family Orchidaceae which is endemic to south-eastern Australia and possibly New Zealand. Its labellum or lip is long and thin, bordered with golden hairs, giving it the name "bearded".

== Description ==
Pterostylis plumosa is a perennial herb rising from round tubers to form small colonies and grows to a height of 12–20 centimetres (5–8 in). It has 5-20 fleshy lance-shaped, pale green leaves crowded around the base of the stem and extending upwards, 10–30 millimetres (0.4–1 in) long and 5–15 millimetres (0.2–0.6 in)wide. There is a single flower on each plant, about 30 millimetres (1 in) long, erect and translucent with fine dark green lines and reticulations. The labellum is long and thin (about 1.5 millimetres (0.06 in) wide), bearded with golden-yellow hairs and ending in a red-brown knob. The dorsal sepal (at the back of the flower) narrows at the end to a thin point, 4 millimetres (0.2 in) long. The flowers appear from August to November.

== Taxonomy and naming ==
Pterostylis plumosa was first described in 1969 by Leo Cady in "Australian Plants" (published by the Australian Native Plants Society), from a specimen collected "on the road to Abercrombie Caves". The specific epithet plumosus is a Latin word meaning "feathered".

== Distribution and habitat ==
The bearded greenhood occurs in New South Wales, Victoria, South Australia and Tasmania. It is also thought to occur in New Zealand. It is an uncommon species, growing in "heathy woodland [in] semi shade".
