= Monjebup Reserve =

Nature reserve in Western Australia

Coordinates: 34.243°S 118.561°E

Monjebup Reserve is a 28.91 km^{2} nature reserve in south-west Western Australia. It is 140 km north-east of Albany, 340 km west of Esperance and 430 km south-east of Perth. It is owned and managed by Bush Heritage Australia (BHA) and forms part of the Gondwana Link project.

== Landscape and vegetation ==
The landscape is diverse, including upland duplex soils, breakaway complexes, sandplains, rocky slopes, hilltops and creeks. Its vegetation communities include mallee, heath, Eucalyptus and Casuarina woodlands, Melaleuca along creeks, Acacia acuminata woodland and Dryandra heath.

== Fauna ==
Animals either recorded, or expected to be present, on the reserve include malleefowl, western whipbird, Carnaby's cockatoo, western mouse, black-gloved wallaby and tammar wallaby. The habitat could support chuditch, red-tailed phascogale, honey possum, western pygmy possum and common brushtail possum.

== Management ==
Monjebup includes intact bushland and areas that have been cleared for cropping. The cleared areas are being revegetated with a diverse suite of native plant species grown from locally collected seed and selected to suit the various soil types present. The revegetation follows the methodology layed out in the National Standards for the Practise of Ecological Restoration Australia.
