= African lovegrass =

African lovegrass is a common name for two plants in the genus Eragrostis, both native to southern Africa:

- Eragrostis echinochloidea
- Eragrostis curvula
