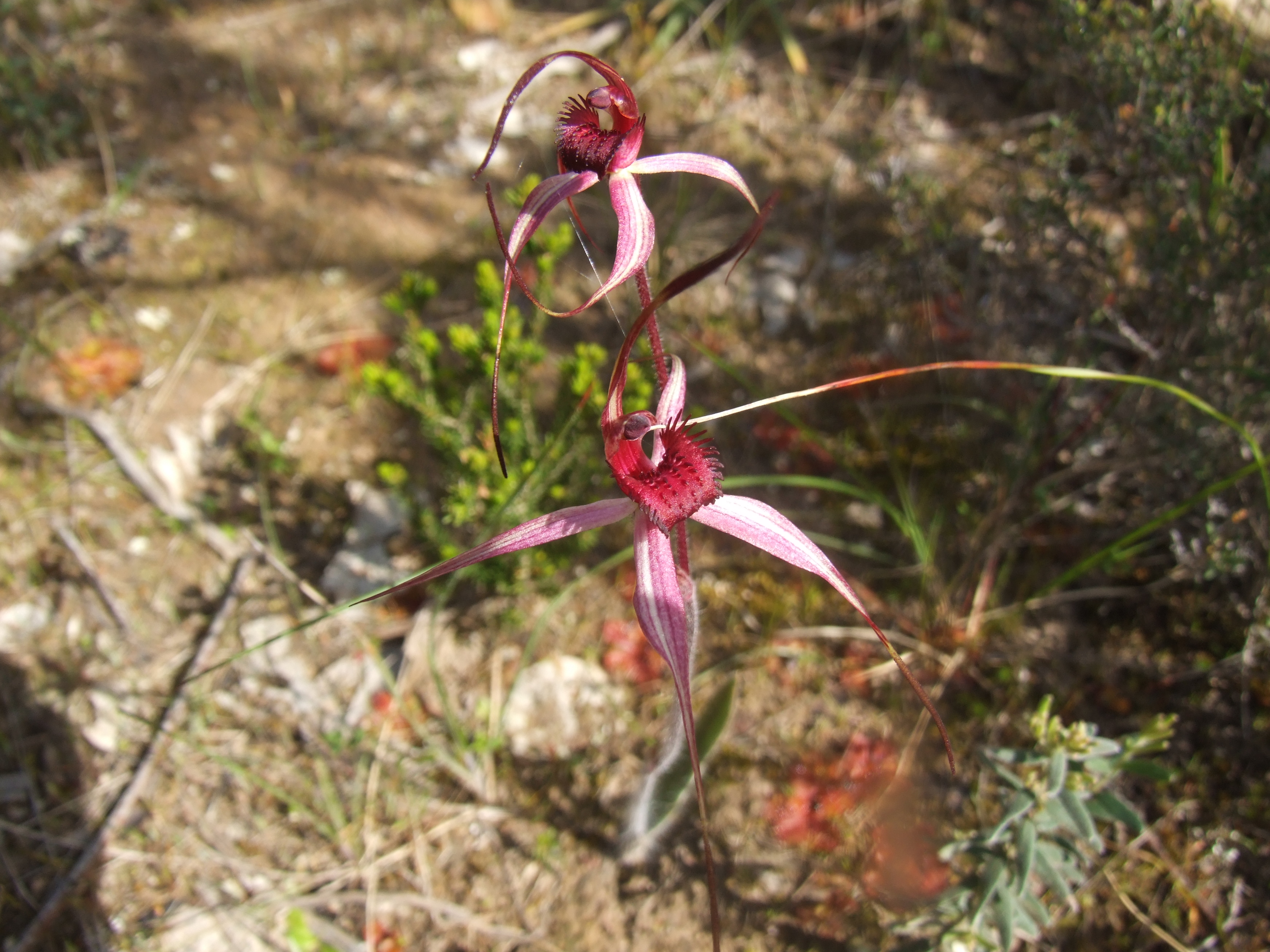

Scientific classification
- Kingdom: Plantae
- Clade: Tracheophytes
- Clade: Angiosperms
- Clade: Monocots
- Order: Asparagales
- Family: Orchidaceae
- Subfamily: Orchidoideae
- Tribe: Diurideae
- Genus: Caladenia
- Species: C. cruciformis

Binomial name
- Caladenia cruciformis D.L.Jones

Synonyms
- Arachnorchis cruciformis (D.L.Jones) D.L.Jones and M.A.Clem.

= Caladenia cruciformis =

Crucifix spider orchid

Species of orchid

Caladenia cruciformis, commonly known as the crucifix spider orchid, or red cross spider orchid, is a plant in the orchid family Orchidaceae and is endemic to a small area in Victoria. It is a rare ground orchid with a single, sparsely hairy leaf and a single dark red to crimson flower with blackish tips.

== Description ==
Caladenia cruciformis is a terrestrial, perennial, deciduous, herb with a marble-sized, underground tuber. In late autumn, a single, sparsely hairy leaf 8–10 cm (3–4 in) long and 3.5–6 mm (0.1–0.2 in) wide with a reddish tinge at its base emerges.

A single dark red to crimson, occasionally pink flower, with darker red stripes is borne on a thin, hairy, dark green to purple spike 15–25 cm (6–10 in) tall. The flowers have a fragrance resembling a hot motor. The petals and lateral sepals are 2.5–4 cm (1–2 in) long and spread widely, giving rise to the common name. The dorsal sepal is erect, 1.5–2 mm (0.06–0.08 in) wide at the base and tapers to a thread-like end with a club-like tip a further 1.5–2 mm (0.06–0.08 in) long and covered with dark red glands. The lateral sepals are about 4 mm (0.2 in) wide at the base then narrow to a thread like end with a club-like tip similar to but shorter than that on the dorsal sepal. The petals are shorter than the sepals and lack the blackish tips. The labellum is egg-shaped to lance-shaped, 10–14 mm (0.4–0.6 in) long and 6–8 mm (0.2–0.3 in) wide and curves downward at the tip. It is dark red with a whitish base and the sides of the labellum turn upwards. There is a fringe of linear teeth about 1 mm (0.04 in) long on the sides but which decrease in size towards the front. There are four to six rows of linear foot-shaped calli along the centre of the labellum, decreasing in size towards the front. Flowering occurs between September and October and is followed by a capsule which releases thousands of black seeds a few weeks later.

== Taxonomy and naming ==
Caladenia cruciformis was first formally described by David L. Jones in 1999 from a specimen collected near Stuart Mill and the description was published in The Orchadian. The specific epithet (cruciformis) is derived from the Latin word crux meaning "cross" and the suffix -formis meaning "shaped".

== Distribution and habitat ==
The red cross spider orchid is found in eucalypt forest or woodland with a heathy understorey, growing in sandy loam with accumulated leaf litter. It is only known from a small area near Stuart Mill and the Dalyenong Nature Conservation Reserve.

== Conservation ==
Caladenia cruciformis is listed as "Endangered" under the Victorian Government Flora and Fauna Guarantee Act 1988. A successful program of propagation and reintroduction of the species has been undertaken and a second generation of reintroduced plants have set seed in four separate sites. The main threats to the species include unauthorised firewood collection, grazing by native and introduced animals, weed invasion, inappropriate burning and illegal collection.
