= Pterostylis excelsa =

Tall rustyhood

Scientific classification
- Kingdom: Plantae
- Clade: Tracheophytes
- Clade: Angiosperms
- Clade: Monocots
- Order: Asparagales
- Family: Orchidaceae
- Subfamily: Orchidoideae
- Tribe: Cranichideae
- Genus: Pterostylis
- Species: P. excelsa

Binomial name
- Pterostylis excelsa M.A.Clem.

Synonyms
- Oligochaetochilus excelsa Szlach. orth. var.; Oligochaetochilus excelsus (M.A.Clem.) Szlach.; Pterostylis mitchellii f. major W.R.Barker, R.M.Barker, Jessop & Vonow nom. inval., pro syn.; Pterostylis hamata auct. non Blackmore & Clemesha: Weber, J.Z. & Bates, R. in Black, J.M. (6 July 1978); Pterostylis mitchellii auct. non Lindl.: Black, J.M. (1943)

Species of orchid

Pterostylis excelsa, commonly known as tall rustyhood, or dry land green-hood is a flowering plant in the orchid family Orchidaceae and is endemic to South Australia. It has a rosette of leaves and when flowering, up to twenty green or brown flowers which lean forward and have a thick, fleshy, partly hairy, insect-like labellum.

== Description ==
Pterostylis excelsa, is a terrestrial, perennial, deciduous, herb with an underground tuber. It has a rosette of between five and twenty leaves 40–80 mm (2–3 in) long and 12–18 mm (0.5–0.7 in) wide. Flowering plants have a rosette at the base of the flowering spike but the leaves are usually withered by flowering time. Between two and twenty green, brown or green and brown flowers with translucent panels and 30–35 mm (1.2–1.4 in) long, 6–8 mm (0.2–0.3 in) wide are borne on a flowering spike 300–900 mm (10–40 in) tall. The flowers lean forward and there are between three and eight stem leaves wrapped around the flowering spike. The dorsal sepal and petals form a hood or "galea" over the column with the dorsal sepal having a narrow tip 8–12 mm (0.3–0.5 in) long. The lateral sepals turn downwards, are about the same width as the galea and suddenly taper to narrow tips 20–25 mm (0.8–1 in) long. The labellum is thick, fleshy, insect-like, 5–6 mm (0.20–0.24 in) long and about 2 mm (0.08 in) wide with short hairs on the "head" end and longer ones on the sides of the "body". Flowering occurs from August to December.

== Taxonomy and naming ==
Pterostylis excelsa was first formally described in 1986 by Mark Clements from a specimen grown in the Australian National Botanic Gardens from a tuber collected from the Eyre Peninsula. The description was published in the fourth edition of the Flora of South Australia. The specific epithet (excelsa) is a Latin word meaning "high", "lofty" or "distinguished".

In 1941, William Nicholls described Pterostylis squamata var. valida and in 1994, David Jones raised it to species status as Pterostylis valida. However, this name is regarded as a synonym of Pterostylis excelsa.

== Distribution and habitat ==
Tall rustyhood is widespread and locally common in the south-east of South Australia, sometimes growing in large colonies. It grows in scrubland and mallee, sometimes on rock outcrops in areas receiving an average annual rainfall of 200–500 mm (8–20 in).
