= North Esk =

North Esk may refer to:

- North Esk River, Tasmania, Australia
- Electoral district of North Esk, Tasmania, Australia
- Electoral division of North Esk, Tasmania, Australia
- Northesk Parish, New Brunswick, Canada, sometimes misspelt North Esk
- River North Esk, Angus and Aberdeenshire, Scotland
- North Esk (Lothian), a tributary of the River Esk, Lothian, Midlothian and East Lothian, Scotland

== See also ==
- River Esk (disambiguation)
- Earl of Northesk
