= South Esk Pine Reserve =

Protected area in Tasmania, Australia

- Location within Tasmania
- Location: Tasmania
- Nearest city: Coles Bay, Tasmania
- Coordinates: 41.9409°S 148.2343°E
- Area: 6.8 ha (17 acres)
- Established: 1998
- Governing body: Bush Heritage Australia
- Website: Official website

South Esk Pine Reserve is a 6.8-hectare (17-acre) nature reserve in eastern Tasmania, Australia, 175 kilometres (109 mi) north-east of Hobart, on the Apsley River near Coles Bay. It is owned and managed by Bush Heritage Australia (BHA), by which it was purchased in 1998.

== Natural values ==
The reserve protects the last large stand of the Tasmanian endemic conifer South Esk Pine. This tree is considered vulnerable, with only 10,000 trees remaining.
