= Aminopeptidase S =

Class of enzymes

Identifiers
- EC no.: 3.4.11.24

Databases
- IntEnz: IntEnz view
- BRENDA: BRENDA entry
- ExPASy: NiceZyme view
- KEGG: KEGG entry
- MetaCyc: metabolic pathway
- PRIAM: profile
- PDB structures: RCSB PDB PDBe PDBsum
Search
- PMC: articles
- PubMed: articles
- NCBI: proteins

Aminopeptidase S (EC 3.4.11.24, Mername-AA022 peptidase, SGAP, aminopeptidase (Streptomyces griseus), Streptomyces griseus aminopeptidase, S. griseus AP, double-zinc aminopeptidase) is an enzyme. This enzyme catalyses the following chemical reaction

Release of an N-terminal amino acid with a preference for large hydrophobic amino-terminus residues

This enzyme contains two zinc molecules in its active site and is activated by Ca^{2+}.
