= Scottdale =

Scottdale is the name of some places in the United States of America:

- Scottdale, Georgia
- Scottdale, Pennsylvania

== See also ==
- Scottsdale (disambiguation)
- Scotsdale (disambiguation)
