= Greening Australia =

- Founded: 1982
- Purpose: Australian environmental management
- Location: Brisbane, Australia
- Region served: Australia
- Method: Science guided revegetation
- Key people: Brendan Foran CEO
- Employees: 150+
- Volunteers: Over 7,000 in 2019
- Website: greeningaustralia.org.au

Greening Australia is an Australian environmental organisation, founded in 1982, the International Year of the Tree, to protect, restore, and conserve Australia's native vegetation. Greening Australia was formed by the United Nations Association of Australia and the Nursery Industry Association of Australia.

In the 1980s, tree cover decline was acknowledged as having a serious adverse impact on agricultural and pastoral productivity. Removal of tree cover was also linked to the development of salinity, soil degradation and erosion, and declining water quality. On World Environment Day in 1982, then Prime Minister Malcolm Fraser announced the establishment of the National Tree Program, which aimed to reverse the decline in tree cover throughout Australia. Greening Australia served as the non-government arm of the National Tree Program. With representation in every state and territory and a national office in Canberra, Greening Australia became the primary focus for non-government tree projects.

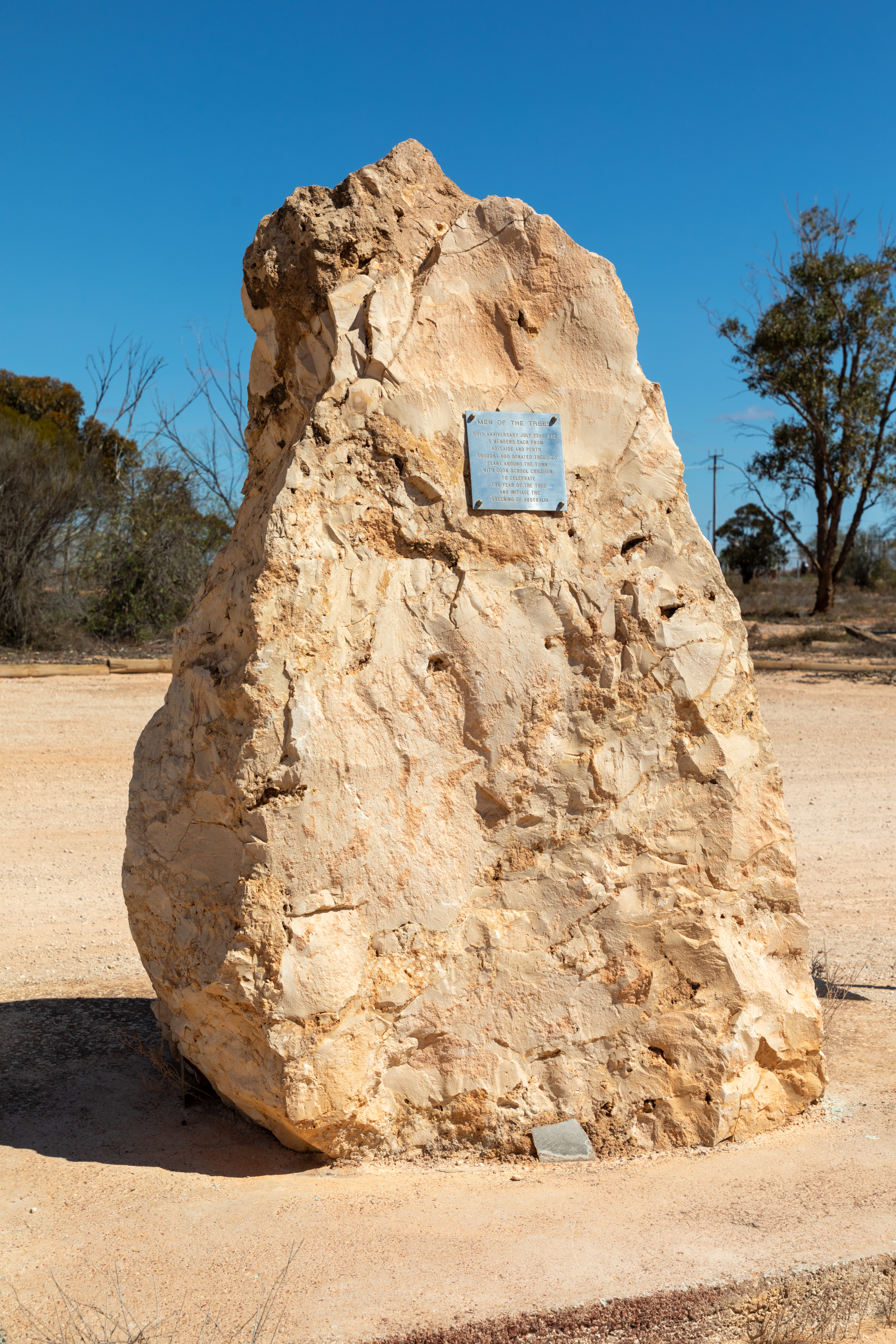
Plaque at Cook, South Australia, commemorating the planting of 600 trees in the town by school children and Men of the Trees in 1982 – the International Year of the Tree – and the inauguration of Greening Australia

Since its inception, Greening Australia has undergone a natural evolution from a focus on trees to a broader focus on landscapes. The Gondwana Link and River Recovery projects reflect this change, and the need to address the impacts of climate change.

Greening Australia has been involved in many large-scale revegetation and restoration projects in Australia since its inception, including the National Tree Program, the One Billion Trees Project, Bushcare Support, National Corrdors of Green, Florabank and Green Corps. The focus of its work lies in providing trees and tree planting services, technical advice, education, volunteer co-ordination, and funding for restoration projects.

On World Environment Day 1998, Greening Australia's work was recognised through its inclusion in the United Nations Environment Programme Global 500 Roll of Honour. This award recognises outstanding achievements in environmental protection, and highlights Australia's role in global conservation efforts.

== Current projects ==
Greening Australia's mission is to conserve and restore landscapes at scale through collaborative, science-based and innovative conservation programs. The organisation has set bold 2030 goals to align their five national programs with global restoration targets. These goals include:

- 500,000,000 native plants established
- 330,000 hectares of habitat restored
- 1,300,000 tonnes of carbon sequestered per annum

Great Southern Landscapes

Since European settlement, agricultural landscapes in southern Australia have lost over 80% of their natural habitat, impacting on threatened species and the productivity of Australia's farmlands.

To help threatened plants and wildlife, and combat global climate change, Greening Australia are working across southern Australia's landscapes, integrating large-scale re-afforestation and carbon sinks into farming systems to create healthy, productive landscapes for people and nature.

Gondwana Link is one of the largest and most ambitious conservation projects in Australia's history. Designed to protect and restore land across and adjoining the nation's only global renowned biodiversity hotspot, the completed link will be an arc of bushland stretching for 1000 kilometres, from the wet forests in Western Australia's far southwest to the edge of the Nullarbor Plain. Greening Australia is working alongside a host of partners on this project, including Bush Heritage Australia and The Nature Conservancy.

The Living Flinders program covers 1.3 million hectares of internationally significant landscape in the Southern Flinders Ranges in South Australia. It is a national hotspot for native plants and animals including the endangered Yellow-Footed Rock-wallaby and supports critically endangered Peppermint Box and Grey Box Grassy Woodlands. The project aims to increase conservation efforts on privately held land as well as reduce invasion by feral species and reconnect existing reserve systems. It is a ten-year project that calls for a $30m investment. Living Flinders is also part of the SA Government's Naturelinks program as well as an important component of the Trans Australia Eco-link.

Reef Aid

Climate change and poor water quality are the greatest threats to the future of the Great Barrier Reef. Greening Australia is addressing both through its Great Southern Landscapes and Reef Aid programs. Reef Aid works with landholders, communities and traditional owners to improve water quality for the Reef by rebuilding gullies and restoring coastal wetlands across the catchment.

Nature in Cities

As climate change and population growth intensify pressures on our urban areas, Greening Australia are working with communities, businesses and governments across Australia to create greener, more liveable cities and urban areas where both people and nature thrive. The program aims to bring nature back to our cities and urban fringes by restoring natural ecosystems and urban tree canopy cover for wildlife; improving water quality in our rivers and wetlands; building green corridors to help meet carbon neutral targets and creating open spaces for recreation.

Tasmania Island Ark

Tasmania is Australia's last refuge for some of Australia's most critically endangered animals – species that are now virtually extinct on the mainland including the Tasmanian Devil, Eastern Bettong, Eastern Quoll and Eastern Barred Bandicoot.

Together with landholders, Tasmania Island Ark is working to recreate 15,000 ha of habitat across the Tasmanian midlands to create a stronghold for endangered wildlife and reconnect people and nature, while revitalising local farming communities.

Thriving on country

Traditional knowledge plays an essential role in conservation and in managing country. Thriving on Country is Greening Australia's organisation-wide commitment to a stronger, reconciled Australia. The organisation partners with Indigenous communities across Australia to bring together traditional and contemporary knowledge, exchange skills, increase employment opportunities and support people to live and work on country.

== Past projects ==
Saltshaker

The Saltshaker Project was an initiative of Greening Australia, SE NSW, the Boorowa Regional Catchment Committee, and Boorowa Council, in association with the Boorowa Landcare Network, to tackle dryland salinity, reduced water quality, and biodiversity in Boorowa, New South Wales. It was funded by the Natural Heritage Trust, and involved nearly 70 landowners.

== Bushfire crisis ==
On 13 January 2020, the Australian Government announced an initial $50m investment in an emergency response to the devastating Australian bushfires for wildlife and habitat recovery. $5 million of this initial investment will see Greening Australia lead the development of a strategic program to build and secure native seed and plant supply for landscape restoration, recovery and resilience in bushfire impacted areas and other vulnerable landscapes.

== Publications ==
Greening Australia has published numerous books on native Australian vegetation, including several authored by South Australian ethnobotanist, Neville Bonney.

== See also ==
- Salinity in Australia
