= River Esk =

River Esk is the name of:

== United Kingdom ==
=== England ===
- River Esk, North Yorkshire, in the North York Moors National Park and the county of North Yorkshire
- River Esk (Ravenglass), in the Lake District National Park and the county of Cumbria
- River Esk (Solway Firth), in the north of the county of Cumbria and along the border with Scotland, also known as the Border Esk

=== Scotland ===
- River Esk (Solway Firth), in Dumfries and Galloway and along the border with England, also known as the Border Esk
- River Esk, Lothian, which runs for much of its length as two separate tributaries, the North Esk and the South Esk
- River North Esk, in Angus and Aberdeenshire
- River South Esk, in Angus

== Australia ==
- Esk River (New South Wales), a tributary of the Clarence River
- Esk River (Queensland)
- North Esk River a river in Tasmania, Australia
- South Esk River a river in Tasmania, Australia

== New Zealand ==
- Esk River (Canterbury), New Zealand
- Esk River (Hawke's Bay), New Zealand

== See also ==
- North Esk (disambiguation)
- South Esk (disambiguation)
