= Australian Native Plants Society =

Society for Australian Native Plant enthusists

The Australian Native Plants Society (Australia) (ANPSA) is a federation of seven state-based member organisations for people interested in Australia's native flora, both in aspects of conservation and in cultivation.

A national conference is held biennially for members of the state-based societies. The combined membership is around 9000 people.

== History ==
The Society for Growing Australian Plants (SGAP) was established in 1957 by a group of people who "pledged to promote the establishment and breeding of Australian native plants for garden, park and farm". By 1958 active regional Societies had been established in six States and the ACT with the Federal Association (ASGAP) being formed in 1962.

Initially the focus was on growing and learning about Australian flora more for home and amenities plantings – members included botanists and horticulturists as well as enthusiastic laypeople. As time has gone on, there has been an increasing focus on conservation, and advocacy for conservation, of Australian flora. The Wildflower Society in Western Australia has been particularly diligent in liaising with government bodies in that state and the New South Wales body is a member of the Nature Conservation Council of NSW.

The national association changed its name to the Australian Native Plants Society (Australia) in 2008.

Rare and "hard to find" Australian plants can be purchased at their plant sales, which typically occur twice a year, spring and autumn, in many regions.

== Promotion of Australian flora ==
Over the years, many important figures in Australian Botany and Horticulture have been members, Alex George, John Wrigley, Rodger Elliot, Angus Stewart and Ivan Holliday to name a few.

Over the years, important texts on Australian flora have been either published by members, or funded by SGAP, including:

- The Banksia Book, by Alex George
- The Grevillea Books (vols 1–3), by Neil Marriott & Peter Olde
- Encyclopedia of Australian Plants Suitable for Cultivation (vols 1–9), Rodger Elliot, David Jones & Trevor Blake
- Native Plants of the Sydney District by Alan Fairley & Philip Moore
- Field Guide to Plants of the Dry Tropics, by Keith Townsend
- Across the Top – Gardening with Australian Plants in the Tropics, by Keith Townsend
- Common native plants of the Coorong region : identification, propagation, historical uses, by Neville Bonney (2004)
- Kemp B (2004). Wildflowers of the North Coast of New South Wales. Kenthurst, New South Wales: New Holland Press. ISBN 1-877069-05-1.
- Mason D (1999). The Blooming Banksia: Easy Identification of Banksias in Far North Eastern NSW and South Eastern Qld. Lismore, New South Wales: Australian Plants Society, NSW Region - Far North Coast Group. ISBN 0-909830-51-7.
- Holliday, Ivan; Watton, Geoffrey (2008) [1977]. Banksias: A Field and Garden Guide (3rd ed.). Adelaide, South Australia: Australian Plants Society (SA Region). ISBN 978-0-9803013-1-1.

== Regional (state-based) bodies ==
The societies are:

- Australian Plants Society (SGAP Victoria) Inc
- Australian Plants Society NSW
- Australian Plants Society – Tasmania Region
- Australian Plants Society – SA Region
- Australian Native Plants Society – Canberra Region
- Society for Growing Australian Plants (SGAP) – Queensland Region
- Wildflower Society of Western Australia

Membership to these societies totals about 9000 people. The vast majority of members live in Australia, though there are members in Europe and America.

== List of species and topics studied ==
- Acacia
- Banksia
- Bonsai
- Brachychiton and allied genera
- Container plants
- Correa
- Daisy (Australian)
- Dryandra
- Epacris
- Eremophila
- Eucalyptus
- Fabaceae
- Fern
- Food plants (Australian)
- Garden design
- Grevillea
- Hakea
- Hibiscus and related genera
- Isopogon and Petrophile
- Melaleuca (including Callistemon, Calothamnus and allied genera)
- Orchids (Australian)
- Palm and cycad (Australian)
- Prostanthera and Westringia
- Rainforest
- Rhamnaceae
- Succulents (Australian)
- Verticordia
- Wallum (Coastal Banksia heath)
- Wetlands
- Wildlife and native plants

== Australian Plants ==
A quarterly colour journal, Australian Plants, has been distributed nationally since 1959, with each region producing a quarterly newsletter. The journal produced a very large range of materials which have been collated. Bill Payne was the journal's editor from its inception until 2001. It is a 48-page newsletter in A5 format.

Text from the Trove entry, states:

V.1 no.1 has cover title "Commonwealth journal of the Society... V.1 no.1-3 each issued in several "reprintings" with differing pagination and contents.
Published by Society for Growing Australian Plants NSW Ltd., (Mar. 1988–); by Australian Plants Society NSW Ltd., (Mar. 2001–)

"Australian plants" is complemented by the Society's online publication, "Australian plants online", but the content of the two publications is completely different.

Also available on microfiche. In: Pinpointer popular periodicals on microfiche [microform]. Canberra: Australian Advisory Council on Bibliographical Services, 1982–1991.
Indexed by: Biological abstracts ISSN 0006-3169.

== See also ==
- Gardening in Australia
- Eucalypt Australia
