= Bush Heritage Australia =

Australian environmental organization

- Logo
- Founded: 1991
- Purpose: Conservation
- Location: Melbourne, Australia
- Region served: Australia
- Method: Acquisition
- Members: 54,000 supporters
- Key people: Bob Brown
- Revenue: A $42,447 (2026 March)
- Employees: 190 staff
- Website: bushheritage.org.au
- Formerly called: Australian Bush Heritage Fund

Bush Heritage Australia is a non-profit organisation with headquarters in Melbourne, Australia, that operates throughout Australia. It was previously known as the Australian Bush Heritage Fund. Its vision is "Healthy Country, Protected Forever."

It works under three impact models:

1. Purchasing land (see 'Reserves' heading below), assessed as being of outstanding conservation value, from private owners, to manage as wildlife reserves in perpetuity.
2. Investing in partnerships with Aboriginal groups, who are often owners of vast estates. Bush Heritage supports the development and implementation of Healthy Country Plans.
3. It partners with farmers to support conservation work and aims to have an influence over 10 million hectares of agricultural land by 2030.

It does so to protect endangered species and preserve Australia's biodiversity. Its 2025-26 Impact Report stated it was contributing to the protection of 25.7 million hectares on its reserves and partnership areas. This included 1.46 million hectares through their reserve network, 9.3 million hectares with their Aboriginal and Torres Strait Islander partners and 14.9 million hectares with agricultural partners. Over 8,700 native species were recorded on its reserves and partnership properties, including hundreds of threatened species.

== History ==
Bush Heritage Australia was founded in 1990 by Bob Brown, who purchased two forested properties in Tasmania, adjoining the Tasmanian Wilderness World Heritage Site, to save them from being woodchipped. He used the prize money from his Goldman Environmental Prize as a deposit, borrowing the rest and setting up the Australian Bush Heritage Fund.

The organization initially developed on a small scale in Tasmania before expanding to Australian mainland, and has grown with the assistance of regular supporters and other donors.

Doug Humann AM led Bush Heritage Australia as CEO from 1997 to 2011, raising its profile nationally. (As of 2021 he is chair of Landcare Australia.) Gerard O'Neill served from 2011 to 2018, followed by Heather Campbell from 2019 to 2023. Rachel Lowry is the current CEO (appointed at the start of 2024).

In 1997 Bush Heritage acquired the lease of Erith Island, an island in the Kent Group, Bass Strait, used for cattle grazing. It was transferred to the Tasmanian Government in 2002 for incorporation into the Kent Group National Park.

In 2011, Bush Heritage entered into a ten-year agreement with the Wunambal Gaambera Aboriginal Corporation, described as the first long-term agreement in Australia between traditional landowners and a non-government conservation organisation. Many similar agreements have since followed. The Healthy Country Plan developed by the two groups supports management of the Indigenous Protected Area (IPA) within the Mitchell River National Park of the Kimberley, Western Australia. Bush Heritage now has an extensive Aboriginal Partnerships Program.

In October 2026 Bush Heritage began publicly fundraising to buy Wooroora Station, which at $25 million AUD is the most expensive property it has every attempted to a acquire. Wooroora is 2,333 hectares (5,683 acre) of rainforest, wet eucalypt forest and savanna which is 100km south of Cairns in Queensland on Jirrbal Country.

== Aims ==
Bush Heritage Australia is striving for the long-term protection of Australia's biodiversity through the acquisition and management of land, water and wildlife of outstanding conservation significance. To do so it focuses its attention and investment on broad 'priority landscape' regions across Australia, selected for a combination of criteria, including the number of threatened species and ecosystems, the number of endemic species, the general condition of the lands, expected climate change impacts and existing staff and resources deployed in the region. Care of Bush Heritage owned properties includes the rehabilitation of degraded land, the control of introduced herbivores and predators, the use of fire as a management tool, consultation and co-operation with neighbouring landowners and Traditional Custodians, as well as with government departments, and the creation of habitat corridors.

Bush Heritage Australia also has a conservation science program led by Bruce Webber. They study the conservation of animal and plant species.

== Conservation impact ==
Bush Heritage Australia contributes to biodiversity conservation through land acquisition, partnerships, and ecological restoration. As of 2026, the organization was involved in the protection and management of over 25.7 million hectares of land across Australia, including both owned reserves and partnership areas.

Its reserves support thousands of native species, including a significant number of threatened species. Conservation activities include habitat restoration, invasive species management, fire management, and long-term ecological monitoring.

== Partnerships and Indigenous collaboration ==
Bush Herritage Australia works in partnership with Aboriginal and Torres Strait Islander communities to support conservation outcomes and land stewardship. These collaborations often involve co-development of "Healthy Country Plans," which integrate ecological management with cultural and spiritual values.

Such partnerships contribute to the management of Indigenous Protected Areas (IPAs) and support traditional land management practices alongside scientific conservation approaches.

== Governance ==
Bush Heritage is run by an independent board of directors skilled in land management and conservation, over 190 paid staff and many volunteers. In 2025-26 Bush Heritage had over 50,000 supporters and hundreds of highly skilled volunteers (contributing over 217,974 hours in 2025-26) who are given opportunities to visit and work on the reserves. Details of income and expenditure can be found in the Impact Report on its website.

== Reserves ==
As of October 2026, Bush Heritage had 46 reserves and was working with many partners contributing to the protection of 22.5 million hectares:

=== Western Australia ===
- Beringa
- Charles Darwin
- Chereninup Creek
- Dodgey Downs
- Ediegarrup
- Eurardy
- Hamelin
- Kojonup
- Monjebup
- Yarrabee (now owned by Greening Australia).
- Red Moort
- Wanarra

=== South Australia ===
- Bon Bon
- Boolcoomatta
- Evelyn Downs

=== Tasmania ===
- Friendly Beaches
- Liffey Valley reserves including Oura Oura, Liffey River, Coalmine Creek, Drys Bluff & Glovers Flat
- South Esk Pine

=== Victoria ===
- Bellair
- Buckrabanyule
- John Colahan Griffin
- Lawan
- Nardoo Hills
- The Round House
- Sanstrom

=== New South Wales ===
- Brogo
- Burrin Burrin
- Nameless Sylvan
- Naree Reserve (incorporating Nil Desperandum)
- Scottsdale
- Tarcutta Hills

=== Queensland ===
- Carnarvon Station
- Currumbin Valley
- Edgbaston
- Ethabuka
- Fan Palm
- Goonderoo
- Pilungah
- Pullen Pullen
- Reedy Creek
- Yourka
- Wooroora

== Aboriginal partnerships ==
- Birriliburu
- Bunuba
- Karajarri
- Wunambal Gaambera
- Mawonga
- Olkola
- Waanyi Garawa
- Arafura
- Mimal

== See also ==
- Conservation in Australia
- List of threatened flora of Australia
- Threatened fauna of Australia
