= Australian Guild of Screen Composers =

Australian professional association

The Australian Guild of Screen Composers (AGSC) is a not for profit organisation, which was established in 1981, "to represent the interests of Australian screen composers by developing and promoting employment opportunities, undertaking educational initiatives and increasing their profile amongst the industry." It was established by Bruce Smeaton and Bruce Rowland. The Guild's head offices are in Sydney, with successive presidents from 1987 being Bob Young (1987–91), Martin Armiger (1992–98), Chris Neal (1999–2000), Art Phillips (2001–08), Clive Harrison (2008–11), Guy Gross (2012–17), Caitlin Yeo (2018–20), Antony Partos (2020–22) and Dale Cornelius (2022–present). Since 1991 it has been sponsored by the Australasian Performing Right Association (APRA).

AGSC presented film and television composers with awards from 1996 to 2000. Each year they released a compilation album, starting with The Australian Guild of Screen Composers 1996 Award Winners in 1997, via Sony Music Australia.

Since 2002 the AGSC, in collaboration with APRA and the affiliated Australasian Mechanical Copyright Owners Society (AMCOS), present Screen Music Awards at an annual ceremony as part of the APRA Music Awards. These honour, "compositions for documentaries, short films, mini-series, children's television and feature film scores" and other screen music scores.

== AGSC Awards 1996–2000 ==
=== AGSC Awards of 1996 ===
Best Music for a Documentary
Title	Artist	Writer	Result
Warriors of the Sky	Peter Kaldor	Peter Kaldor	Won
Best Music for an Educational, Training or Corporate Film/Video
Excerpts from The Zone, "Zone 39"	Burkhard Dallwitz	Burkhard Dallwitz	Won
Best Music for a Children's Television Series
Hotel Sorrento, Brilliant Lies	Nerida Tyson-Chew	Nerida Tyson-Chew	Won
Best Music for a Short Film
In Living Memory, Entice	Paul Anthony Smith	Paul Anthony Smith	Won
Special Achievement in Sound Design
Bonehead	Supersonic	Paul Healey, Antony Partos, Andrew Lancaster	Won
Best Music for an Advertisement
Water Rats, Today Tonight, Sex/Life, Witness	Les Gock, Rivett, Irwin, Jehan	Les Gock, Rivett, Irwin, Jehan	Won
Best Original Music in a Television Series or Serial
"Priscilla, Queen of the Desert", "Frauds", "Bordertown"	Guy Gross	Guy Gross	Won
Best Original Song for a Feature Film, TV Series, Telemovie, or Mini-Series
"Victory – The Lighthorsemen", "Singapore Sling"	Mario Millo	Mario Millo	Won
Best Music in a Mini-Series or Telemovie
The Thorn Birds – The Missing Years	Gary McDonald, Laurie Stone	Gary McDonald, Laurie Stone	Won
Best Original Title Theme Composed for a Television Series, Serial or Mini-Series
Pacific Drive	Chris Neal, Brady Neal	Chris Neal, Brady Neal	Won
Best Soundtrack Album
The Edge	Nigel Westlake	Nigel Westlake	Won
Best Original Music for a Feature Film
Children of the Revolution	Nigel Westlake	Nigel Westlake	Won
=== AGSC Awards of 1997 ===
Best Music for a Documentary
Title	Artist	Writer	Result
"An Imaginary Life", "Flight of the Albatross"	Jan Preston	Jan Preston	Won
Best Music for an Educational, Training or Corporate Film/Video
"Inside Your Feelings"	Stephen Joyce	Stephen Joyce	Won
Best Original Music by a Student Composer
"No Night" from Sneak Preview	Anthony Linden Jones	Anthony Linden Jones	Won
Best Music for a Children's Television Series
Ocean Girl (season 4), Balanced Particle Freeway	Garry McDonald, Lawrence Stone	Garry McDonald, Lawrence Stone	Won
Best Music for a Short Film
Eat Your Greens, Dusk Waltz	Linley Hindmarsh	Linley Hindmarsh	Won
Special Achievement in Sound Design
"Brother Jack" featuring Kylie Canty	Adrian Van de Velde	Adrian Van de Velde	Won
Best Music for an Advertisement
Optus: "Busted", "Porn Star", "Empire"	Supersonic	Andrew Lancaster, Paul Healy, Antony Partos	Won
Best Original Music in a Television Series or Serial
Ocean Girl (season 4), The Balanced Particle Freeway	Garry McDonald, Lawrence Stone	Garry McDonald, Lawrence Stone	Won
Best Music for a News Show, Station ID or Other Promo
ABC Station ID, WAFI, King Wave Beach, Feral Search, Showtime ID, Nick @ Nite Opener	Ken Francis	Ken Francis	Won
Best Original Music in a TV Series
Twisted Tales, Under the Lighthouse Dancing, Fern Gully 2	Nerida Tyson-Chew	Nerida Tyson-Chew	Won
Best Original Title Theme Composed for a Television Series, Serial or Mini-Series
Fallen Angels	Guy Gross	Guy Gross	Won
Best Soundtrack Album
The Fall Symphony	David Hirschfelder	David Hirschfelder	Won
Best Original Song
"Wish I Was 22" from Fistful of Flies	Felicity Fox	Felicity Fox	Won
=== AGSC Awards of 1998 ===
Best Music for a Documentary
Title	Artist	Writer	Result
Africa's Elephant Kingdom	Roger Mason	Roger Mason	Won
Best Music for an Educational, Training or Corporate Film/Video
"Loading Zone" for Canberra Project 2000	Antonio Gambale	Antonio Gambale	Won
Best Original Music by a Student Composer
Excerpts from Static	Steven Baker	Steven Baker	Won
Best Music for a Children's Television Series
Excerpts from "Petals", "Ice Sculptures", "The Hunt" and others – Petals	Justin McCoy	Justin McCoy	Won
Best Music for a Short Film
Theme from Milk, "Tango" from Triple Word Score	Christopher Gordon	Christopher Gordon	Won
Special Achievement in Sound Design
Excerpts from "Gresham's Fly Fishing", "Qantas", "Caltex" and others – Gresham's Fly Fishing	Simon Lister	Simon Lister	Won
Best Music for an Advertisement
Telstra: Streetball – "Lament"	Peter Miller	Peter Miller	Won
Best Original Music in a Television Series or Serial
Africa's Elephant Kingdom tied with Land of the Future Eaters	Roger Mason tied with Robert Moss	Roger Mason tied with Robert Moss	Won
Best Music for a News Show, Station ID or Other Promo
Express 98	Cezary Skubiszewski	Cezary Skubiszewski	Won
Best Original Title Theme Composed for a Television Series, Serial or Mini-Series
Moby Dick	Christopher Gordon	Christopher Gordon	Won
Best Soundtrack Album
The Sound of One Hand Clapping	Cezary Skubiszewski	Cezary Skubiszewski	Won
Best Original Song
"The Sound of One Hand Clapping" from The Sound of One Hand Clapping	Cezary Skubiszewski	Cezary Skubiszewski	Won
Special Achievement
"Resurrection" for orchestra (Note: Recognising achievement as the Artistic Director, Camerata Project for Youth Music Australia.)	Edward Primrose	Edward Primrose	Won
Best Original Music for a Feature Film
"Playful Flirting" from The White Hell of Piz Palu (Note: The original 1929 silent film, The White Hell of Pitz Palu, was restored in 1997. A new score by Ashley Irwin was used.) tied with Excerpts from A Little Bit of Soul	Ashley Irwin tied with Nigel Westlake	Ashley Irwin tied with Nigel Westlake	Won
=== AGSC Awards of 1999 ===
Best Original Music for a Documentary
Title	Artist	Writer	Result
Renzo Piano: Piece by Piece	Richard Vella	Richard Vella	Won
Best Music for an Educational, Training or Corporate Film/Video
"Mirvac"	Melburnian String Quartet	Dale Cornelius	Won
Best Original Music by a Student Composer
Structures on Rail	Robert Griffin Morgan	Robert Griffin Morgan	Won
Best Music for a Children's TV or Animation Series
See How They Run	Mario Millo	Mario Millo	Won
Best Original Music for a Short Film
The Order	George Gogos	George Gogos	Won
Special Achievement in Sound Design
Project Vlad	Luke Gielmuda	Luke Gielmuda	Won
Best Original Music for an Advertisement
Ansett: "Star Alliance"	Cezary Skubiszewski	Cezary Skubiszewski	Won
Best Original Music in a TV Series or Serial
The Lost World	Garry McDonald and Lawrence Stone; Nerida Tyson-Chew	Garry McDonald, Lawrence Stone; Nerida Tyson-Chew	Won
Best Music for a News Show, Station ID or Other Promo
Farscape trailer	Guy Gross	Guy Gross	Won
Best Original Title Theme Composed for a Television Series, Serial or Mini-Series
The Day of the Roses	Roger Mason	Roger Mason	Won
Best Original Music for a Soundtrack
Soft Fruit	Antony Partos	Antony Partos	Won
Best Original Song Composed for a Feature Film, Telemovie, TV Series or Mini-Series
"SeaChange Theme Song" featuring Wendy Morrison from SeaChange	Richard Pleasance	Richard Pleasance	Won
Best Music for a Mini-Series or a Telemovie
The Day of the Roses	Roger Mason	Roger Mason	Won
Best Original Music for a Feature Film
Two Hands	Cezary Skubiszewski	Cezary Skubiszewski	Won
=== AGSC Awards of 2000 ===
Best Original Music for a Documentary
Title	Artist	Writer	Result
Uncle Chatzket	Guy Gross	Guy Gross	Won
Best Original Music by a Student Composer
Icarus	Geoffrey Russell	Geoffrey Russell	Won
Best Music for a Children's Television Series
Thunderstone (series 3)	Garry McDonald and Lawrence Stone	Garry McDonald, Lawrence Stone	Won
Best Original Music for a Short Film
Confessions of a Headhunter	Roger Mason	Roger Mason	Won
Special Achievement in Sound Design
Weetbix	Simon Lister	Simon Lister	Won
Best Original Music for an Advertisement
"The Fly"	Guy Gross	Guy Gross	Won
Best Music in a Television Series or Serial
The Lost World	Garry McDonald and Lawrence Stone	Garry McDonald, Lawrence Stone	Won
Best Music for a Station ID or Promo
Fox 8	Ken Francis	Ken Francis	Won
Best Title Theme Composed for a TV Series, Serial or Mini-Series
On the Beach	Christopher Gordon	Christopher Gordon	Won
Best Soundtrack Album
On the Beach	Christopher Gordon	Christopher Gordon	Won
Best Music for a Mini-Series or a Telemovie
On the Beach	Christopher Gordon	Christopher Gordon	Won
Best Music for a Feature Film
Better Than Sex	David Hirschfelder	David Hirschfelder	Won
