= Gardening in Australia =

Gardening in Australia reflects the different styles of Australian art, including influences from Roman, Islamic, Italian, French, and English gardens. Modern Australian gardening emphasize gardens and their surroundings, focusing heavily on both urban horticulture and landscape architecture.

There are many historical parks and gardens in Australia.

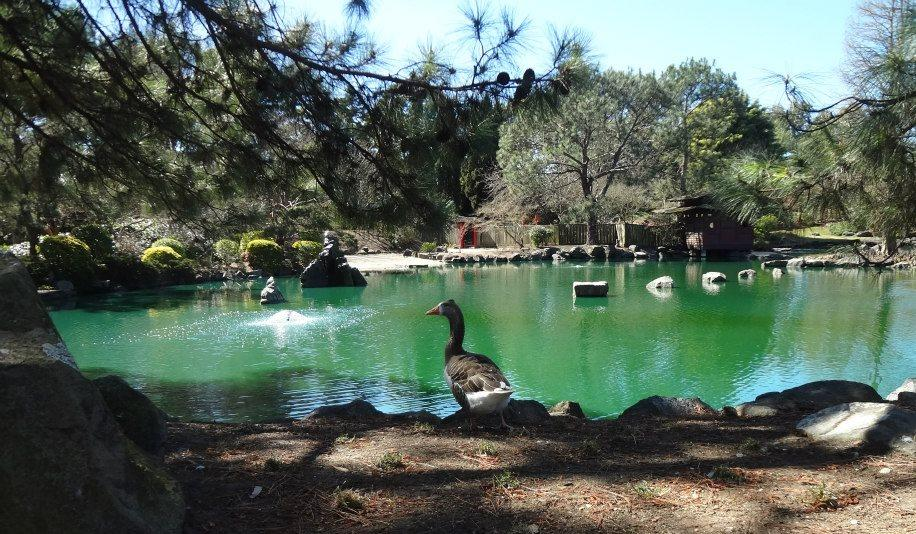
Auburn Botanical Gardens, with a view of its lake

The first botanical gardens in Australia were founded early in the 19th century. The Royal Botanic Gardens, Sydney, 1816; the Royal Tasmanian Botanical Gardens, 1818; the Royal Botanic Gardens, Melbourne, 1845; Adelaide Botanic Gardens, 1854; and Brisbane Botanic Gardens, 1855. These were established essentially as colonial gardens of economic botany and acclimatisation. The Auburn Botanical Gardens, 1977, located in Sydney's western suburbs, are one of the popular and diverse botanical gardens in the Greater Western Sydney area.

In 1942, Australia's prime minister John Curtin launched a "Dig for Victory" campaign as rationing, drought, and a shortage of agricultural workers began to affect food supplies. This encouraged homeowners all over Australia to grow crops to help the war effort. The campaign was well received by the media as well as the large populace, as many Australians were already self-sufficient in growing their own fruits and vegetables. The YWCA created "Garden Army Week" to advertise the newly created "Garden Army" which exclusively supported agriculture and crop production. The situation began to ease in 1943 as fear of invasion lessened; however, home gardens continued throughout the war.

== Australian garden design ==
Colonial-style gardens are still popular, while understanding and use of Australian native gardening is becoming more widespread.

The first formal gardens were influenced by the aesthetics of British settlers who were unfamiliar with Australia and often sought to recreate aspects of where they had come from, such as the English country garden. This included the importation of plants from Europe, initially for food, and the landscaping of broader lands for the cultivation of agriculture, forestry and grazing (displacing maintenance by Australian Aboriginal peoples). Informal and ornamental gardens would be established at private estates, such as small cottage gardens and Mediterranean-climate gardens, while land around settlements would be reserved for future public use and the establishment of important botanical gardens. However, Australia's diverse climate, along with more growth and immigration, meant more diverse styles and philosophies of garden could be grown, such as Japanese gardens.

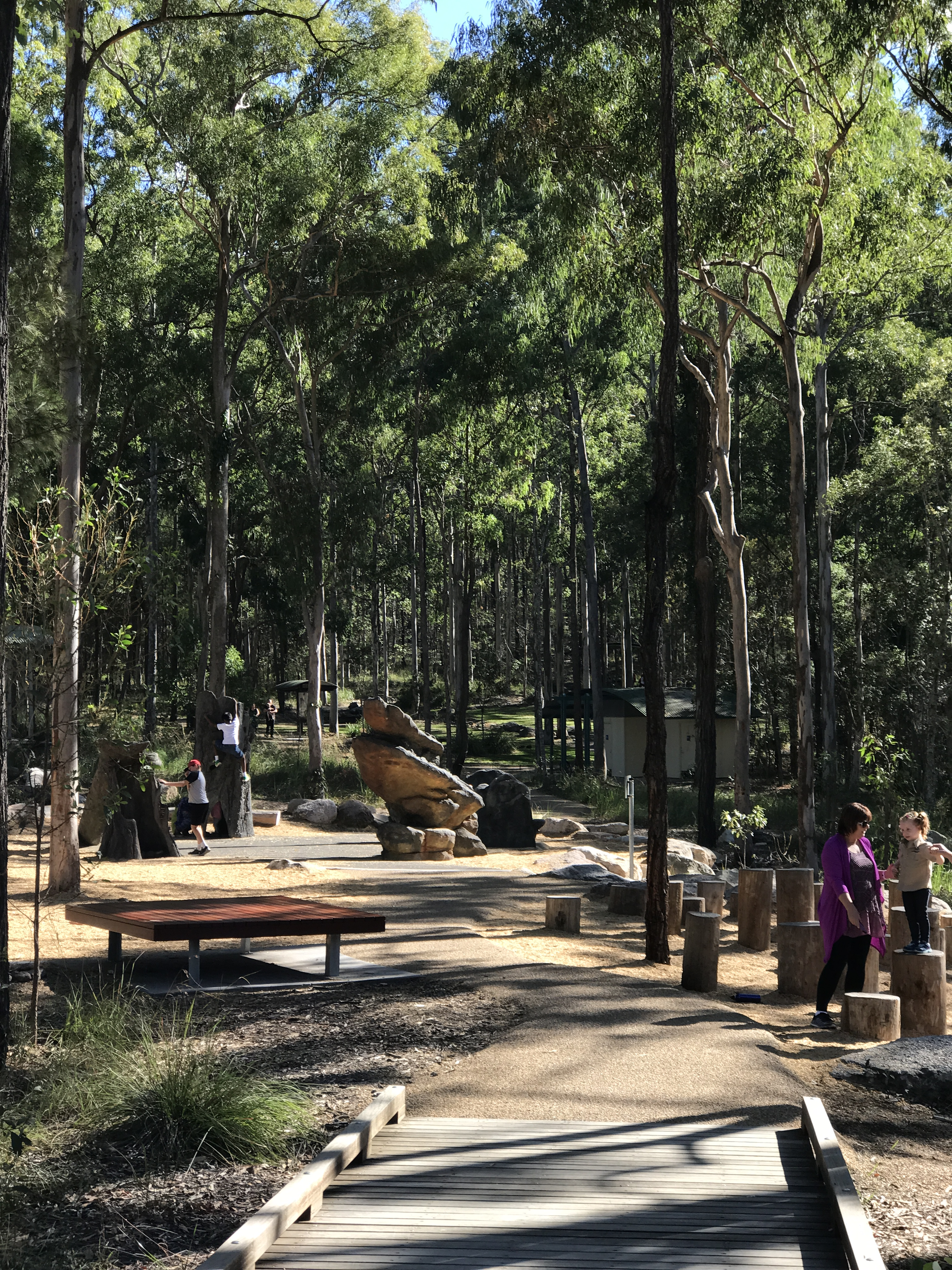
Karawatha Forest Park

Over time, interest in rediscovering traditional knowledge and expertise of the uses of Australia's native plants grew. New Australian-style gardens are inspired by combinations of almost any style and are now found across Australia and some other parts of the world. They are usually specific to the particular area they are grown in, whether as private gardens, as parts of or as entire public parks (often emphasising botanical exploration and re-establishment of wildlife habitat), in revegetation programmes for wetlands and grasslands, and as rain gardens utilising smaller spaces on streets. Common features include stone gardens, artworks and shade structures, cultural and historical information, and edible gardens.

== Common plants ==
Some common plants are:

=== Trees ===
- Jacaranda

=== Plants ===
- Eucalyptus

== Rare plants ==
- Antarctic beech
- King's lomatia
- Mongarlowe mallee
- Wollemi pine

== Events ==
Floriade is the largest flower festival in the Southern Hemisphere, with over 400,000 visitors each year. Almond Blossom Festival, Carnival of Flowers, Kings Park Festival, Melbourne International Flower and Garden Show and Tesselaar Tulip Festival are some others.

== Organizations ==
- Australian Garden History Society
- Australian Institute of Horticulture
- Australian Native Plants Society
- Australian Organic Farming and Gardening Society
- Australian Society of Horticultural Science
- Eucalypt Australia
- National Rose Society of Western Australia
- Royal Agricultural and Horticultural Society of South Australia
- The Seed Savers' Network
- Victorian College of Agriculture and Horticulture
- Village Community Co-operative
- Wildflower Society of Western Australia

== Media coverage ==
A range of books, magazines and television programmes are dedicated to the topic in Australia.

=== Printed works ===
- Australian House & Garden
- Better Homes and Gardens
- Gardening Australia
- NZ Gardener
- South Australian Vigneron and Gardeners' Manual

=== Television ===
- Australia's Best Backyards
- Backyard Blitz
- Better Homes and Gardens (TV program)
- Burke's Backyard
- Costa's Garden Odyssey
- Domestic Blitz
- The Garden Gurus
- Gardening Australia
- Guerrilla Gardeners
- The Outdoor Room
- Vasili's Garden

== See also ==
- Agriculture in Australia
- Heritage gardens in Australia
- Parks and gardens of Adelaide
- Parks and gardens of Brisbane
- Parks and gardens of Melbourne
- Parks and gardens of Sydney
- List of botanical gardens in Australia
- List of national parks of Australia
- List of parks and gardens in rural South Australia
- Category:Gardening by country

== Sources ==
- Aitken, Richard & Looker, Michael (2002). The Oxford Companion to Australian Gardens. Melbourne: Oxford University Press. ISBN 978-0-19-553644-7.
