= Brilliant Lies =

- Film poster
- Directed by: Richard Franklin
- Written by: Peter Fitzpatrick; Richard Franklin; David Williamson
- Based on: Brilliant Lies (play) by David Williamson
- Produced by: Sue Farrelly; Richard Franklin
- Starring: Gia Carides; Anthony LaPaglia; Zoe Carides; Ray Barrett
- Cinematography: Geoff Burton
- Edited by: David Pulbrook
- Music by: Nerida Tyson-Chew
- Distributed by: Umbrella Entertainment
- Release date: 8 August 1996
- Running time: 94 minutes
- Country: Australia
- Language: English
- Budget: A$3.5 million
- Box office: A$199,329 (Australia)

Brilliant Lies is a 1996 Australian drama film produced by Bayside Pictures and Beyond Films. It stars Gia Carides and Anthony LaPaglia. It was directed by Richard Franklin and produced by Sue Farrelly, Kim McKillop and Richard Franklin. It was written by Peter Fitzpatrick and Richard Franklin, based on a play by David Williamson.

Nerida Tyson-Chew composed the music score, the second time she had composed for a film directed by Richard Franklin (after Hotel Sorrento).

The film was an adaptation of David Williamson's play of the same name, published by Currency Press in 1993.

The theme song is included on Kate Ceberano's 1996 album Blue Box.

== Plot synopsis ==
Susy Conner accuses former employer Gary Fitzgerald of harassment and unfair dismissal for failing to comply with his sexual demands. Relating the incident to conciliation lawyer Marion Lee, Susy comments that the trauma experienced should entitle her to a compensation payment of $40,000.

== Cast ==
- Anthony LaPaglia as Gary Fitzgerald
- Gia Carides as Susy Connor
- Zoe Carides as Katy Connor
- Ray Barrett as Brian Connor
- Catherine Wilkin as Marion Lee
- Michael Veitch as Paul Connor
- Neil Melville as Vince
- Jennifer Jarman-Walker as Ruth Miller
- Lisa Aldenhoven as Stephanie Fitzgerald

== Production ==
Richard Franklin had seen the play on stage and decided to make it after having successfully filmed a stage play Hotel Sorrento. The film was shot in July 1995.

== Box office ==
Brilliant Lies grossed $199,329 in Australia.

== Reception ==
Brilliant Lies received positive reviews from critics, earning an 80% approval rating on Rotten Tomatoes.

=== Accolades ===
Award	Category	Subject	Result
AACTA Awards (1996 AFI Awards)	Best Actress	Gia Carides	Nominated
AACTA Awards (1996 AFI Awards)	Best Supporting Actor	Ray Barrett	Nominated
AACTA Awards (1996 AFI Awards)	Best Supporting Actress	Zoe Carides	Nominated
AGSC Award	Best Original Song Composed for the Screen	Nerida Tyson-Chew	Nominated

== See also ==
- Cinema of Australia
