= Peace Memorial Rose Garden =

Rose garden in Nedlands, Western Australia

Coordinates: 31.9807°S 115.7995°E

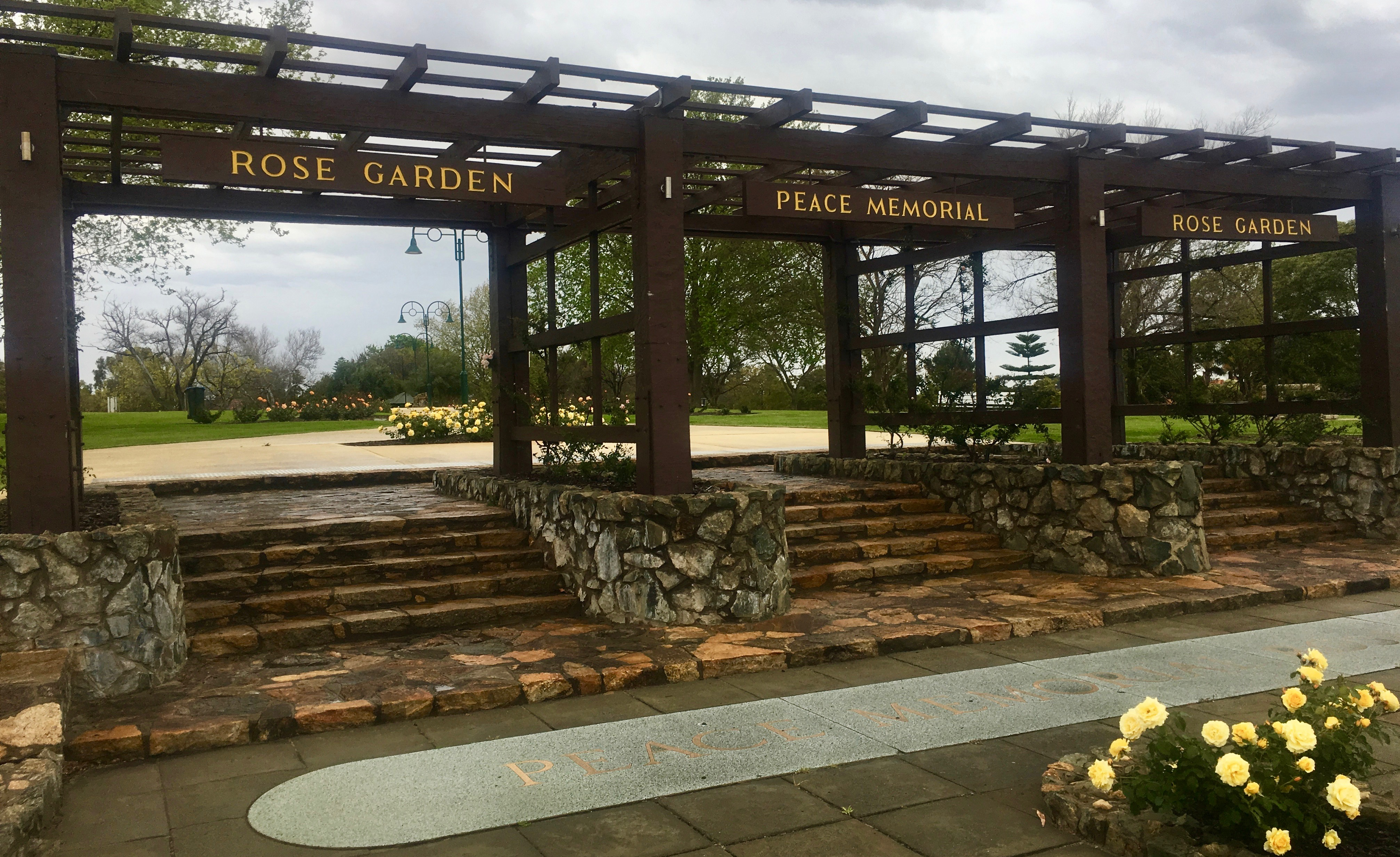
Northern, Stirling Highway entry

Peace Memorial Rose Garden is a rose garden in Nedlands, Western Australia, dedicated to the memory of lives lost in war. Located on Stirling Highway and bounded by Louise and Vincent Streets, the garden was developed by the Nedlands Road Board and the National Rose Society of Western Australia. It was proposed in 1946, and consideration of a site in Kings Park was made later that year. Land in Nedlands was made available in 1948, and further plans were made in 1950. The garden was dedicated by the Governor of Western Australia, James Mitchell on 22 October 1950.

== See also ==
- Australia's Open Garden Scheme
- Gardening in Australia
- Heritage gardens in Australia
