= Costa Georgiadis =

Australian landscape architect and TV presenter (born 1964)

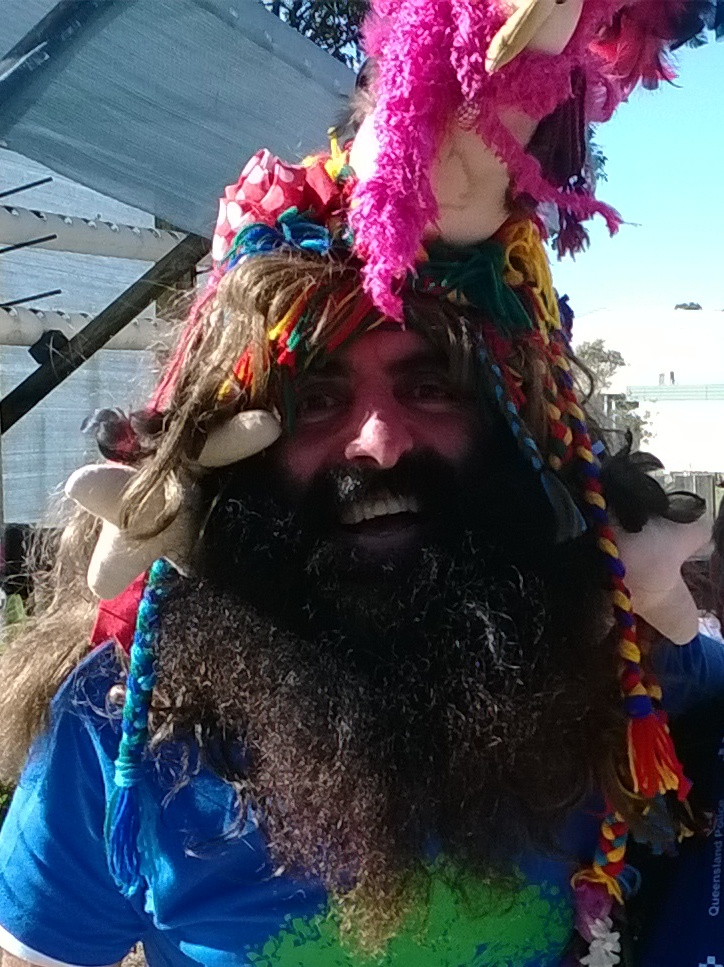
- Georgiadis in 2015
- Born: 1 January 1964 (age 62); Sydney, New South Wales, Australia
- Education: University of New South Wales
- Occupations: Landscape architect, television presenter
- Years active: 2009—present
- Employer: Australian Broadcasting Corporation
- Known for: Gardening Australia

Costa Georgiadis (born 1 January 1964) is an Australian author, landscape architect, environmental educator and television presenter. Costa is the third host of ABC television series Gardening Australia after Peter Cundall and Stephen Ryan, and previously appeared as 'Costa the Garden Gnome' in the ABC Kids program Get Grubby TV.

== Early life ==
Georgiadis was born in Sydney to parents Stan and Anne Georgiadis, and grew up in North Bondi on the same street as his grandparents and uncle. He is the youngest of three children. His father, Stan, was an electrician. His paternal grandfather, Constantine Georgiadis was born in Thessaloniki, and arrived in Australia in 1927 via South America. Constantine and wife Julia were market gardeners, and were responsible for fostering Costa's early interest in gardening.

== Career ==
Georgadis worked as a landscaper whilst studying landscape architecture at the University of New South Wales, where he developed an interest in sustainability.

From 2009 to 2011, he presented SBS's Costa's Garden Odyssey, a programme that explored the relationship between gardening, sustainability, and spirituality.

On 20 December 2011 the ABC announced that Georgiadis would replace Stephen Ryan as the host of Gardening Australia.

In 2014, Georgiadis starred as 'Costa the Garden Gnome' in Get Grubby TV on ABC Kids.

In 2021, Georgiadis was the host of a six part podcast called Gardening Buds, which is featured in the ABC Kids Listen app. He also published Costa's World: Gardening for the soil, the soul and the suburbs.

In 2023, he began hosting Gardening Australia Junior on ABC Kids. In 2024, Georgiadis was the subject chosen for ABC Radio Brisbane's annual art competition The Bradley. In 2025 he appeared as a contestant on Claire Hooper's House Of Games.

== Awards and nominations ==
For his hosting role on Gardening Australia, Georgiadis won the Silver Logie for Most Popular Presenter and was nominated for the Gold Logie for Most Popular Personality on Australian Television at the 2019 Logie Awards.

In 2021, Georgiadis won two Australian Academy of Cinema and Television Arts (AACTA) Audience Choice Awards, for Favourite Entertainment Show and Favourite Television Host.
