= Laurel Bank Park =

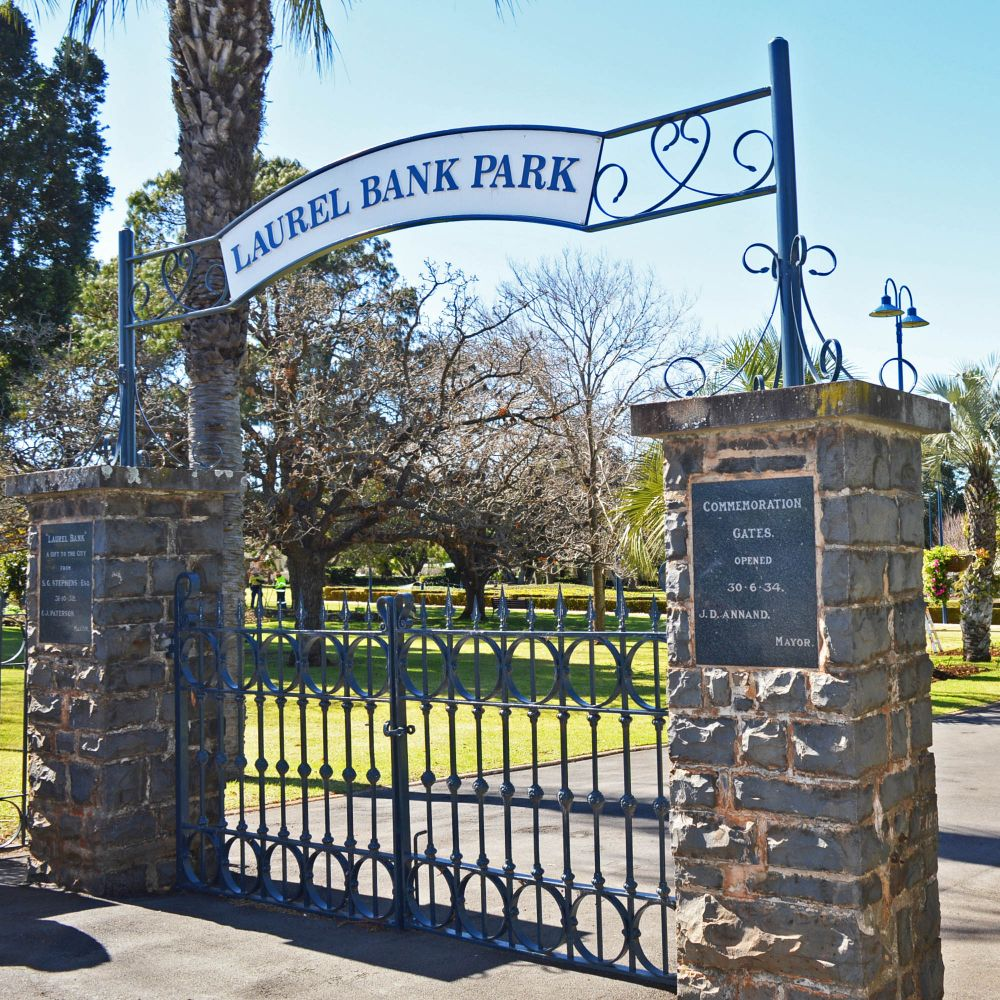
- Laurel Bank Park, 2018

- Location within Queensland
- 27.5624°S 151.9442°E
- Location: cnr West Street, Hill Street and Herries Street, Toowoomba City, Toowoomba, Toowoomba Region, Queensland, Australia

History
- Design period: 1900–1914 (Early 20th century)
- Built: 1904–1943, 1904–1943, 1904–2018, Landscaping, including: mature trees, avenues, perimeter plantings, hedges, 1934, 1935–1939, 1938, 1943–1945

Queensland Heritage Register
- Official name: Laurel Bank Park
- Type: state heritage
- Designated: 30 November 2018
- Reference no.: 650083
- Type: Defence: Military camp; Parks/Gardens/Trees: Garden – public; Parks/Gardens/Trees: Tree groups – avenue of; Parks/gardens/trees: Garden – private; Parks/gardens/trees: Public park/reserve; Parks/gardens/trees: Tree; Recreation and Entertainment: Croquet lawn/clubhouse
- Theme: Exploiting, utilising and transforming the land: Valuing and appreciating the environment and landscapes; Developing secondary and tertiary industries: Catering for tourists; Building settlements, towns, cities and dwellings: Developing urban services and amenities; Maintaining order: Defending the country; Creating social and cultural institutions: Sport and recreation

Laurel Bank Park is a heritage-listed park at the corner of West Street, Hill Street and Herries Street, Toowoomba City, Toowoomba, Toowoomba Region, Queensland, Australia. It was built from 1904 to 1943. It was added to the Queensland Heritage Register on 30 November 2018.

== History ==
Laurel Bank Park is a 4.3-hectare (11-acre) public park situated approximately 800 metres (2,600 ft) southwest of Toowoomba railway station. It is bounded by Herries, West and Hill streets. The park was donated to the City of Toowoomba in 1932 by local resident Samuel George Stephens (junior), after almost thirty years of developing the beautiful gardens. Within the park are many cold-climate mature trees considered of horticultural importance. Two croquet lawns and a croquet clubhouse were added to the park in the 1930s. During World War II (WWII) the park was used as a United States Navy (USN) submariners' rest and recreation camp. The intact former mess hall is the only building remaining from the camp in the park. Since the 1930s, the picturesque park has been a major tourist attraction in Toowoomba and this continues today.

The Toowoomba area is the traditional land of the Giabal people. The area was surveyed and sold for private development in 1853 and named Toowoomba in 1858. In July 1865 the first section of the first railway in Queensland (the Main line railway) was opened to Ipswich, and by April 1867 the line reached Toowoomba. In 1887 Toowoomba was proclaimed a town.

At an elevation of 700 metres (2,300 ft) above sea level, Toowoomba experiences cool temperatures throughout the year. The climate has enabled certain species of trees and plants, unable to be grown in warmer areas such as Brisbane, to flourish. In 1860 the town's first mayor and early pioneer, William Groom, had lobbied the Queenslandcolonial government for a recreational reserve for the town, which was eventually granted in 1869 and by the late 1870s had become Toowoomba's Queens Park and Botanic Gardens. In 1875 a curator was appointed and, with the assistance of the curator of the Brisbane City Botanic Gardens, Walter Hill, a public recreational park was established, as well as a botanic garden intended for experimental planting for scientific and commercial purposes. By the early 1920s the town was increasingly known as the "Garden City", due to the large number of beautiful and well-established private gardens, its extensive street-tree plantings dating to the 1870s, and numerous landscaped parks. Civic pride has been fostered by Toowoomba residents through their gardens and parks, reflected by the establishment of a series of garden competitions and festivals which took place from the early 1900s until the end of World War I.

The Stephens family were important Toowoomba pioneers. Samuel George Stephens (senior) arrived in Toowoomba from Wales in 1863. SG Stephens played a role in the town's progress. A successful businessman, he was one of the owners of the Darling Downs Gazette and a founder of the Darling Downs Building Society. Philanthropic pursuits included involvement in the establishment of the Toowoomba Grammar School, the Toowoomba Hospital, the fire brigade and his parish church. One of his major endeavours was the garden at his home "Llanwyn", also in Herries Street, considered one of the most beautiful in Toowoomba at the time, described in an 1879 newspaper article as "one of the neatest and most complete in its arrangements of any in Toowoomba". His son, Samuel George Stephens (junior), who was born in Toowoomba in 1865, inherited his father's love of horticulture. Educated at Toowoomba Grammar School, he joined his father's business, becoming managing director in 1909. He continued his father's philanthropic commitment to community and charitable causes including the Toowoomba General Hospital, the Toowoomba Cemetery Trust, the Toowoomba School of Arts committee, and as a member of the Society for the Prevention of Cruelty.

In 1904 Stephens purchased two lots of land totalling approximately 1087m^{2} on Hill Street, West Toowoomba. Over the next 12 years he incrementally acquired another 44 lots creating an area of approximately 4 hectares, and removed existing houses from the properties. By 1918 the majority of the block bounded by Hill, West and Herries streets was in Stephens' ownership. As the land was cleared, Stephens transformed it into an extensive garden which by 1934 was considered to be one of the most beautiful in Toowoomba.

As early as the mid-nineteenth century, there was a focus on the importation of exotic plant species to Queensland, attested by the establishment of the Queensland Acclimatisation Society in 1862 as well as several botanic gardens including the Brisbane City Botanical Gardens (1855). The foremost intention was to test the propagation potential of certain species that may be commercially suitable for Queensland's fledgling agricultural industry. Trials on ornamental trees for civic and domestic spaces were also undertaken and these gardens became places of passive recreation for the public.

During the interwar period, as suburban expansion increased throughout Australian cities, residents moved away from the crowded inner-city suburbs and into newly subdivided housing estates. A new focus on gardening emerged and the nursery industry boomed. There was a demand for both imported, exotic species as well as for native varieties. Specialist nurseries catered for this burgeoning demand. Stephens established his garden amid this renewed vigour.

For almost 30 years Stephens worked tirelessly in his garden, designing its layout and displays, and planting and maintaining it. He aspired to establish a garden that would give pleasure to people, rather than cultivating plants of commercial or scientific value, as was often the case in Queensland's botanic gardens.

Stephens imported a wide variety of exotic, rare and valuable tree, plant and flower specimens for his garden. Contemporary reports described the gardens in 1932, as:

"a comprehensive collection of rare shrubs and plants, Japanese and Chinese importations ... there are 5000 gladioli, comprising 400 kinds, and 2000 daffodils, consisting of 30 varieties. The bulbs total 25,000. Beds of flowers and trees are picturesquely arranged among well-kept lawns".

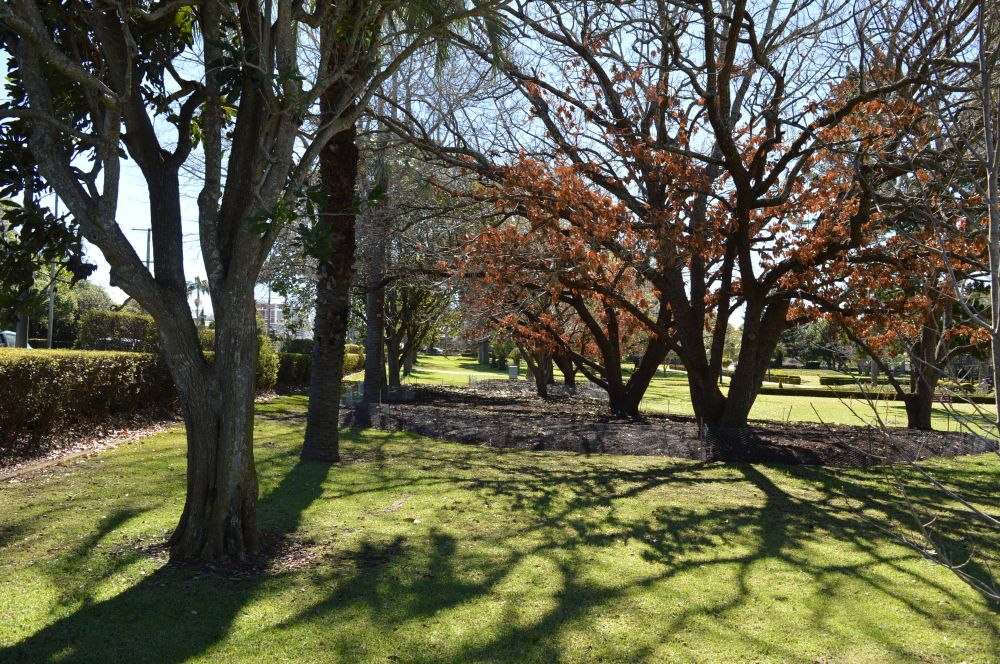
West end of the park, 2018

As it developed, the garden was admired by Toowoomba residents and Stephens soon became known to many as "the man of flowers". In 1932, when asked to comment on Stephens' garden, the curator of the Brisbane City Botanic Gardens, Ernest William Bick, declared it was "the largest and most varied collection in Australia". Numerous species of oak, cedar, maple and palm trees were imported for the garden and many of these species were, at the time, considered to be very rare in Australia. Over the years, Stephens supplied the Toowoomba hospital with his flowers.

In 1932, Stephens gifted the garden to the people of Toowoomba as a public park. On 31 October 1932 the official opening ceremony was attended by Stephens, the Mayor, FJ Paterson, and several other dignitaries. The Mayor, on behalf of the citizens of Toowoomba, accepted the deeds, and his wife declared that "Mr Stephens had not spared time, money or experience in making the garden one of the most beautiful in Australia".

On handing the garden to the Toowoomba City Council, Stephens made several stipulations. The first was to have the park named "Laurel Bank" as he did not want it to be named after him. Another was to allow a portion of the park to be used for tennis, croquet or basketball; no sport, however, was to be played in the park on Sundays, Good Friday and Anzac Day. Flowers from the park would continue to be supplied to the Toowoomba hospital. At the time, it was reported that the improved property was valued at £10,000.

To memorialise this generous donation to the city, commemoration gates were erected by the Council at the entrance to Laurel Bank Park in 1934. They consisted of locally quarried bluestone pillars with decorative wrought-iron gates and two commemorative plaques. The official dedication ceremony was held in June 1934 and was attended by the Mayor, James Douglas Annand, and his wife. Stephens also attended and stated that "Laurel [Bank] Park was given to the people of Toowoomba for their benefit for ever".

The donation of the park was a gesture uncommon in both the history of Toowoomba and the state. Other parks and gardens developed privately and now owned publicly were generally acquired by the government, including Newstead Park in Brisbane and Thomas Park Bougainvillea Gardens at Indooroopilly. Others such as Myall Park Botanic Garden remain managed by a volunteer board of directors. Boyce Gardens, another Toowoomba garden property, was developed privately and donated to the University of Queensland in 1969; it is devoted to the propagation, preservation and study of native species, and, while not publicly owned, is publicly accessible. Stephen's gift differed, as the fully established park was a donation to the council; at the time, it was declared one of the most generous donations for Toowoomba and Queensland.

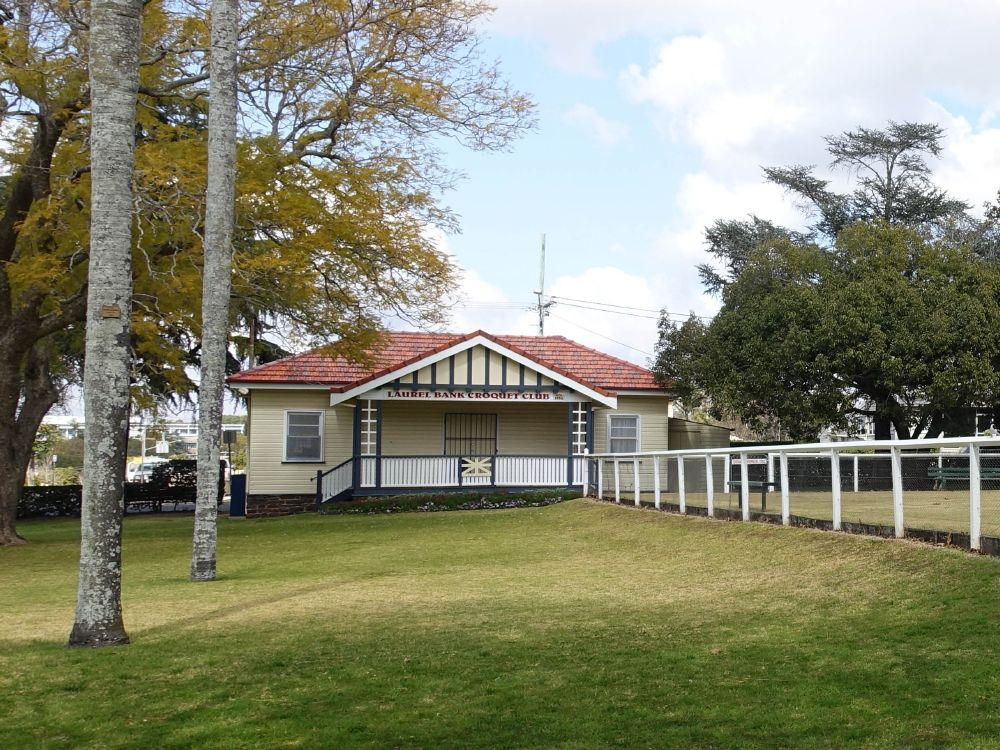
Croquet club house, 2018

Following agreements with Stephens and the council, the Laurel Bank Croquet Club was formed in 1934 and was the third croquet club in Toowoomba; the two earlier clubs were Toowoomba and Toowoomba West. It was agreed that a portion of Laurel Bank Park would be dedicated for two croquet lawns and a clubhouse. Fundraising for the club began almost immediately with garden parties and fetes held in the park. Two lawns were laid by March 1935 and timber benches installed. Much of the work was undertaken as Depression-era relief work, provided by the council. The official opening ceremony in March 1935 was attended by Stephens, who was given the honour of striking the first ball, and stated that he hoped "the members would have much happiness and pleasure in using them". When first opened, the club had twenty-six members.

After much effort, funds were eventually raised to begin the construction of a clubhouse to the design of architect Matthew C Williamson. In October 1937 Williamson advertised a tender in the Architectural and Builders Journal of Queensland for "a croquet clubhouse at Toowoomba". Further fundraising through events such as bridge nights, as well as generous donations from patrons, enabled the club to complete the construction of the clubhouse. When completed in 1938, the new clubhouse was described as "a compact, cream-painted building, finished with touches of brown ... it stands in a picturesque setting on green lawns, shade trees and flowering shrubs". The official opening on 7 May 1938 was attended by Mayor Annand, state ministers and aldermen, as well as Stephens and Williamson. Timber seats around the lawns had been built by 1936 and the creepers to shade the seats also planted that year. Timber fences surrounding both lawns were complete by 1939.

Toowoomba was considered a mountain retreat for those attempting to escape the heat and humidity, abundant in other parts of Queensland. From as early as the 1900s, the Railway Department ran an excursion train from Brisbane to Toowoomba and back for southern tourists arriving by steamship in Brisbane, on their way to holiday in the Cairns region. The one-day trips included a driving tour of the city's beauty spots taken by staff from the Toowoomba City Council. To re-invigorate the city's tourist potential a promotional campaign was carried out in 1931 by the Toowoomba Tourist Bureau "for the purpose of making an effort to attract visitors". The campaign proved successful and by 1938 Toowoomba experienced record numbers of tourists. The campaign included advertisements placed in many newspapers, both state and interstate, as well as a publication of a promotional tourist guidebook that was first published in 1934, "Toowoomba: Queensland's Ideal Mountain Resort". Toowoomba's charms included the cooler climate, scenic lookouts with panoramic views, and beautiful parks and gardens. Over the next decade, a guidebook of several editions was produced.

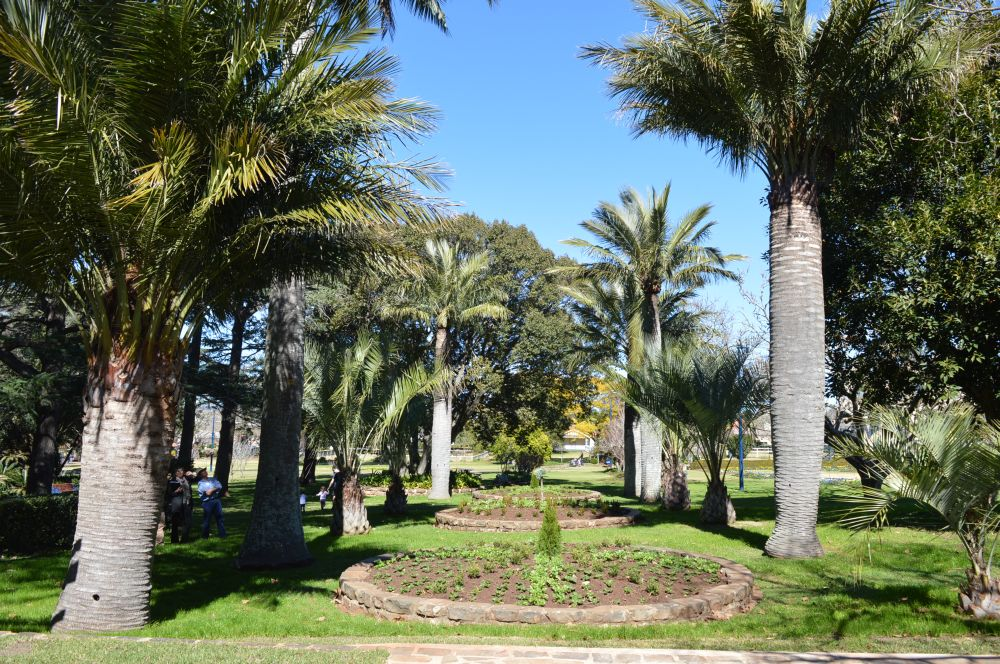
Chilean Wine Palms, 2018

Laurel Bank Park was one of the main attractions featured in the guidebook. Stephens' generous donation to the city was always noted, as were the extensive and important plantings, "nowhere in Australia is to be found a finer collection of Japanese flowering plants ... There are trees and shrubs in Laurel Bank Park not to be found anywhere else in Australia". In 1940 the Darling Downs Centenary Souvenir, 1840–1940 featured Laurel Bank Park as one of Toowoomba's most attractive parks.

Following the United States of America's entry into WWII, Brisbane became the strategic centre for planning for the South West Pacific Campaign. Military camps and infrastructure were swiftly constructed throughout Queensland and thousands of US and Australian troops awaited deployment to the Pacific. Facilities for troops on rest and recreation leave (R&R) were also established. In Toowoomba, the US Navy (USN) built two R&R camps for submariners - one in Laurel Bank Park and the other in Newtown Park (15m north-west of Laurel Bank Park). The main R&R camps for the USN were situated in Coolangatta on the Gold Coast, but these do not survive.

In Laurel Bank Park, a series of temporary timber camp buildings were erected in the northwest and southeast corner of the park. A mess hall was also built on a lawn situated behind a curved avenue of palm trees fronting Hill Street. The camp could accommodate up to 100 enlisted men; submarine officers were quartered on the Gold Coast. Toowoomba's residents welcomed the submariners and their hospitality was reported at the time in The Courier Mail:

"here the men from battle stations have from 10 days to two weeks' leave, single private rooms being provided free of charge. Toowoomba residents co-operative to provide service and entertainment".

The construction of the camp buildings was organised through the Allied Works Council (AWC) and carried out by the Department of Public Works with the combined cost of the Toowoomba camps being £92,000.

The design of the former mess hall followed the AWC's standard design, the pre-cut "CA" type, which was widely used throughout Australia. The basic module of the "CA" type was for sleeping or stores huts and could be adapted to other uses. It was rectangular in plan, raised on stumps, made with a timber frame, various wall claddings and a gable roof. They were designed to be made of readily available local materials and constructed by local contractors using common building techniques. Tens of thousands of "CA" type huts were built across Australia during WWII. At war's end, the Commonwealth Disposals Commission sold many of "CA" huts, which were either relocated or demolished.

Stephens died in 1944 before he could witness the park returned to its pre-WWII beauty. In September 1945, his sister, Miss MR Stephens wrote a letter to the Town Clerk conveying her brother's sadness over the military buildings in the park, and stressed that these structures should be removed. She was sure the citizens of Toowoomba "would rejoice to have Laurel Bank again as a place of rest and beauty".

By 1947 the majority of the camp buildings had been removed from the park. Many of them were relocated by the council to a site a few kilometres away on the corner of West and Fanny streets, to be converted into homes for the aged. Others were sold to various church and community groups and moved off site. The former mess hall was retained in the park as a community hall. It was initially used by the YWCA and the West Toowoomba Progress Association and later as a dance venue and for wedding receptions. The hall continues to be an important community centre in Toowoomba.

In a public meeting in the Toowoomba town hall in September 1949, a decision was made to revive the garden competitions and festivals. The first "Carnival of Flowers" was held in October 1950 and was a resounding success, with more than 50,000 people lining the main street to watch the opening parade. This heralded eight days of festivities focused on Toowoomba's beautiful gardens, both public and private. Money raised from the carnival went to local charities. The following year, the date of the carnival was moved to September, to coincide with the school holidays. Since then, the carnival has continued every year and is visited by thousands of people from around the state and the country. It is Queensland's longest running annual festival.

Laurel Bank Park featured as a main attraction during the carnival with the Council planting thousands of flowers in the park for the event. In the 1951 souvenir brochure, the park was included on the official programme with a band scheduled to play in the park on Sunday afternoon. In subsequent souvenir brochures, the park was also featured as an attraction not to be missed.

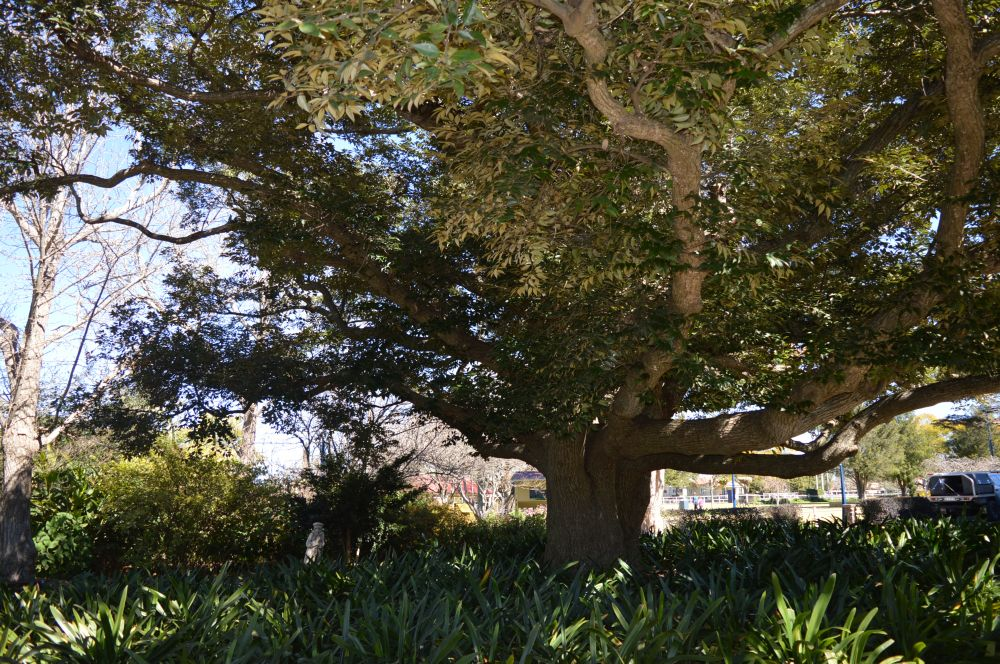
Mature oak tree (Lithocarpus sp.), 2018

Within the park are numerous horticulturally important cold climate trees Stephens imported from other countries. Several of these have been identified in the National Trust of Australia's Significant Tree Register; an Oak (Lithocarpus spp), Mori Oak (Quercus morii), a Bristle-toothed Oak (Quercus acutissima), an English Oak (Quercus robur), and an avenue of Chilean Wine Palms (Jubaea chilensis). All of these trees are identified as regionally important. Laurel Bank Park is also listed on the Australian Government's Directory of Australian Botanic Gardens, along with Toowoomba's Queens Park and Botanic Gardens.

In 1980 the scented gardens were established in the southeast corner of the park. It was an initiative by the Toowoomba City Council and the Rotary Club of Toowoomba East to provide a scented garden for people with visual impairments. The rose garden, wisteria arbour, picnic shelter, viewing platform, southern toilet block, children's playground and topiaries were introduced to the garden in the 1990s.

In 2018, Laurel Bank Park is a prominent attraction for locals, tourists, and horticultural enthusiasts and is listed on the Lonely Planet, Trip Advisor and Southern Queensland Country travel websites as one of the "top things to do" in Toowoomba; with the park particularly popular during the city's annual Carnival of Flowers. The Laurel Bank Croquet Club continues to be a valuable community sporting facility close to the centre of Toowoomba. Stephens' collection of important trees are considered to be of high horticultural value. The traditional layout of the gardens continue to reflect Stephens' intention for the park to be a place of rest and beauty.

== Description ==
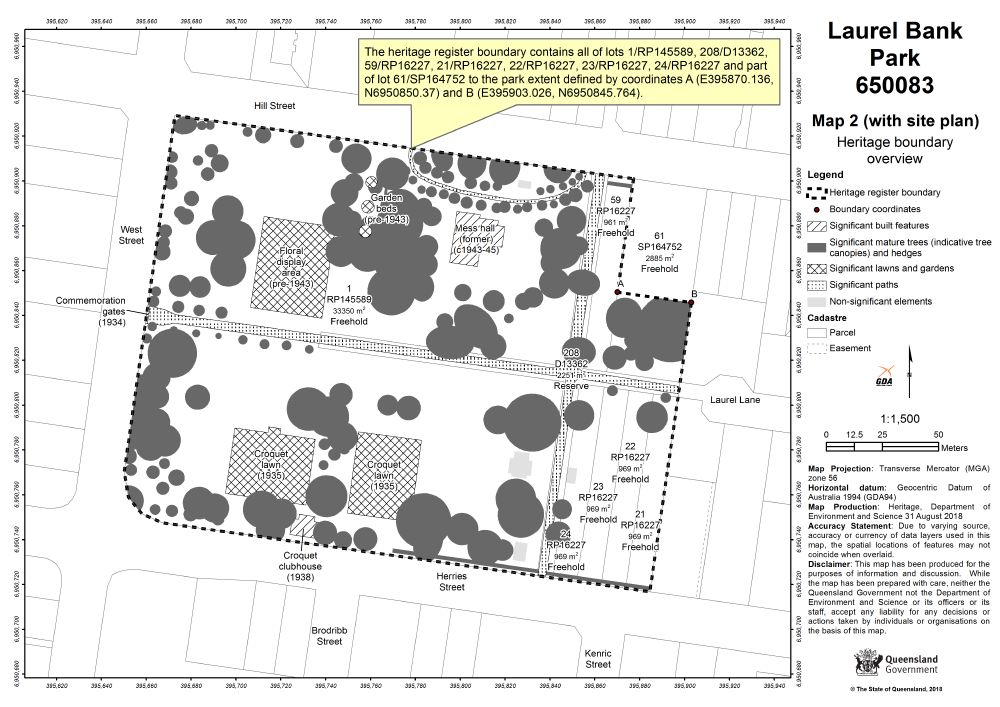
Site map, 2018

Laurel Bank Park is 4.3ha public park used for recreation, gardening and public events, and located approximately 800m southwest of Toowoomba railway station. The formal entrance to the park is via West Street (west), with other sides of the site bounded and accessed by Hill Street (north), Laurel Lane, residential properties, and disability support services (east), and Herries Street (south). The park is largely an open space with turf, garden beds, established trees and buildings.

=== Footpaths and Site Arrangement ===
Two footpaths run through the park and define its geometric and formal site arrangement. They are the primary circulation routes, providing strong sight-lines to and from the surrounding streets and through the park.

=== Commemoration Gates (1934) ===
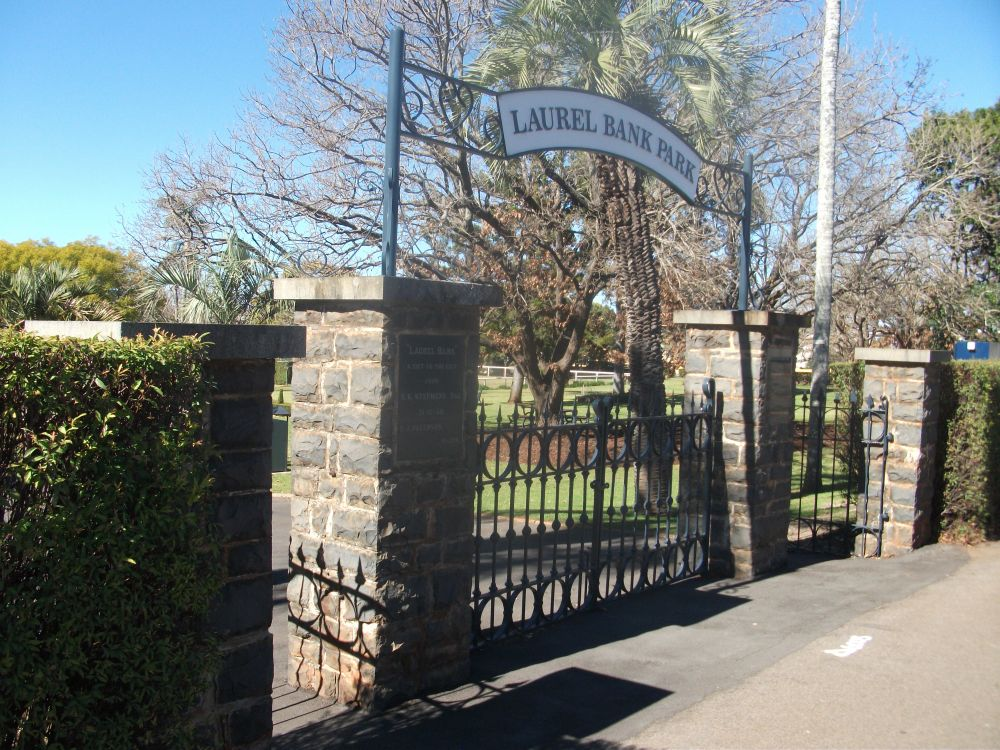
Commemorative gates, 2018

The Commemoration Gates are centred on the West Street boundary, marking the formal entrance to the park. The gates comprise four blue-stone pillars with squared stone capping of a lighter colour and wrought iron gates. They commemorate SG Stephens.

Two stone plaques, dated 30 October 1932 (park gifted to the city) and 30 June 1934 (gates opened), are mounted on the two central pillars.

=== Floral Display Area (pre-1943) ===
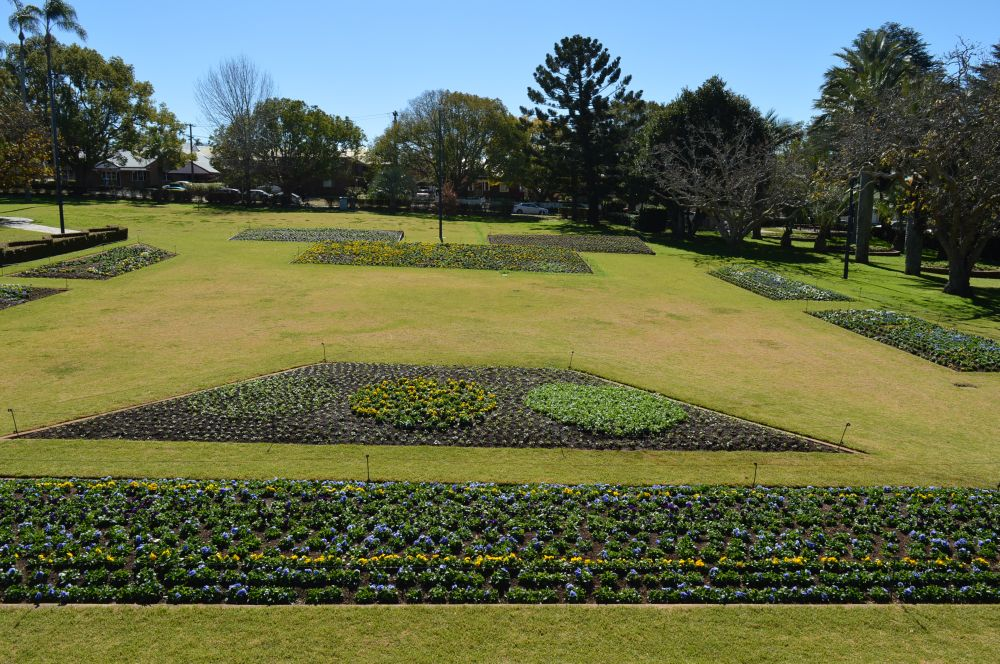
Floral display area, 2018

The Floral Display Area is an approximately rectangular space at the northwest end of the site. A focal point of the park, gardens in this area are regularly reconfigured, themed, and bedded with flowering plants for display (particularly for Toowoomba's annual Carnival of Flowers).

=== Laurel Bank Croquet Club (1935-1939) ===
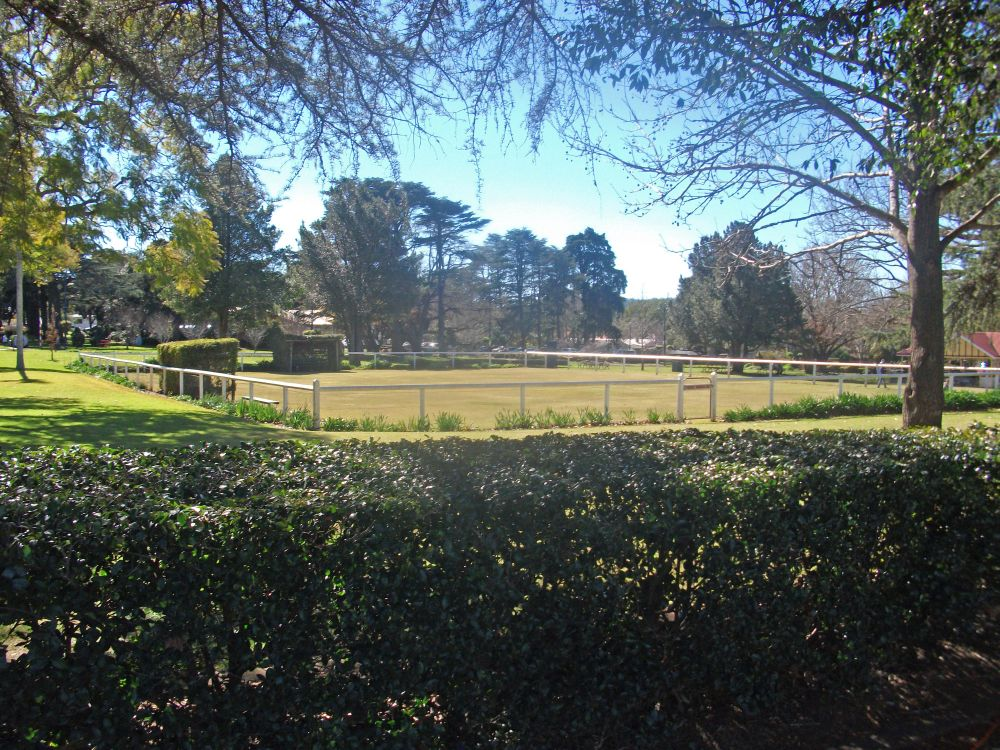
Croquet lawn, 2018

The Laurel Bank Croquet Club is located on the southwest side of the park. It comprises a croquet clubhouse (1938) with two croquet lawns (1935) to the northeast and northwest. The clubhouse is a rectangular, timber-framed structure, set on a stone base and sheltered by a hip roof with a projecting northern gable. Externally, it is approximately symmetrical and its northern verandah is approached by small stairs at the east and west.

=== Mess Hall (former) (c. 1943-45) ===
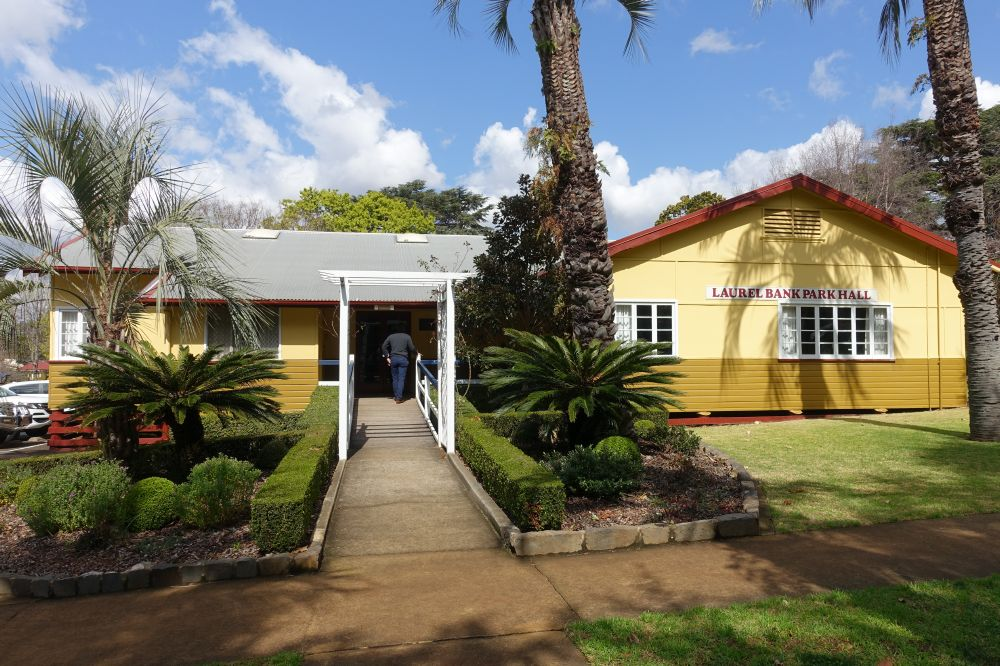
Former mess hall, now public hall, 2018

The Mess Hall (former) is located at the northeast end of the site, east of the Floral Display Area. It is a single-storey, prefabricated, timber-framed hall, of the Allied Works Council's "CA" type. The building is approximately T-shaped in plan, has perpendicular gable roofs, and remains in its original location, which is uncommon. It is accessed via a northern verandah, with secondary entrances to the east (concrete stair) and west (recent ramp). A brick chimney protrudes from the east end of the building. Evidence of its prefabrication is visible in the roof trusses (internally exposed at the south end of the building), paired eaves brackets, and notches in timber floor joists.

The interior comprises the former dining room and the former recreation room, entered via the front verandah. Located at the west, the dining room is the larger of the two spaces and features a raised platform at the south end. East of the dining room is the recreation room, and south of the dining room is a servery (the former canteen), kitchen and store rooms.

Original additions to the standard mess hall plan include: a front verandah enclosure forming a ticketing office; toilets and store rooms south of the recreation room (excluding some recent toilet partitions); and an enclosure to the southeast verandah.

== Heritage listing ==
Laurel Bank Park was listed on the Queensland Heritage Register on 30 November 2018 having satisfied the following criteria.

The place is important in demonstrating the evolution or pattern of Queensland's history.

Laurel Bank Park is important in demonstrating the evolution of Queensland's private gardens and public parks. A privately owned garden established in 1904 by prominent Toowoomba resident, Samuel George Stephens, the property was gifted to the Toowoomba City Council in 1932 for use as a public park, providing rest, beauty and passive recreation for residents and visitors.

Laurel Bank Park retains important surviving evidence of the early layout of the park, including pathways, mature plantings and formal gardens, and long-term recreational use by the croquet club (1934).

Laurel Bank Park is important as a fine example of botanical amenity horticulture and the popular practice of importing exotic horticultural specimens during the early twentieth century. Many mature trees in the park demonstrate these practices, being cooler climate specimens imported from places such as China, Japan and South America.

The Mess Hall (former) (1943–45) is an important example of the Australian and United States military's requirements for the provision of rest and recreation camps for troops during World War II (WWII). The Mess Hall (former) is a good, intact example of a "CA" hut, built under the Allied Works Council's prefabrication programme.

The place demonstrates rare, uncommon or endangered aspects of Queensland's cultural heritage.

Laurel Bank Park's collection of mature and established cooler climate trees is thought to be most extensive in Queensland, and as such is uncommon. Many horticulturally important specimens planted by Stephens by the 1930s are considered significant, including several varieties of oak, cedar and maple trees and Chilean wine palms.

The place is important in demonstrating the principal characteristics of a particular class of cultural places.

Laurel Bank Park is important as an intact and representative example of a Queensland park established in the early twentieth century. It demonstrates the principal characteristics of its type through its: formal site configuration; axial paths; open lawn areas; mature trees and landscaping, often planted in avenues; floral arrangements; formal entry gates; and the provision of passive recreation facilities (evidenced by a croquet clubhouse, croquet lawns, and a regularly-reconfigured floral display area).

The Mess Hall (former) is an intact example of a prefabricated mess hall, constructed by the Allied Works Council for the United States military during WWII. The building remains in its original location and is important in illustrating the principal characteristics of its type through: its prefabricated construction; gable roof with gable end vents; external cladding of timber chamferboards and flat sheets; timber stumps with metal ant-caps; timber-framed casement windows; internal wall and ceiling linings of flat sheets; timber floorboards; and large recreation and dining spaces, serviced by a kitchen, canteen, bathrooms and stores.

Laurel Bank Croquet Club in its form and layout is a good, intact example of a croquet club, demonstrating the principal characteristics of its type through its: domestic-scale clubhouse, which provides shelter, amenity and a social space to club members, and the storage of equipment; and two manicured croquet lawns with perimeter fencing and shaded seating.

The place is important because of its aesthetic significance.

Laurel Bank Park provides a harmonious setting of mature exotic and native trees, flowering plants bedded in formal arrangements, hedges, lawns; original Commemoration Gates (1934); and open space; with views and vistas along landscaped avenues, axial pathways and from surrounding streets.

The strong aesthetic appeal of the park is demonstrated through the extensive and continuous use of images of the place in publications and travel guides promoting it as a beautiful park in Toowoomba and Queensland since the interwar period. Its popularity as a major tourist attraction in Toowoomba is particularly evident during the Carnival of Flowers, when its flowering displays are extensively photographed and appreciated by both the local community and tourists.

The place has a strong or special association with a particular community or cultural group for social, cultural or spiritual reasons.

Laurel Bank Park has been highly valued by the Toowoomba community and horticultural enthusiasts since SG Stephens gifted the park to the city in 1932. As one of the city's major attractions, it has a longstanding association with the city's annual Carnival of Flowers festival, Toowoomba's premier cultural event and Queensland's longest running festival. The park's continuous use as a place for passive recreation has been sustained since the 1930s.
