= National Rose Society of Western Australia =

The National Rose Society of Western Australia is a rose growing association in Western Australia established in 1932.

It was formed on the model of the earlier established National Rose Society of Victoria. Membership growth in the 1930s was notable.

It has conducted annual shows and competitions.

It was involved in establishing the Peace Memorial Rose Garden in Nedlands.

== See also ==
- Gardening in Australia
