= Jane Edmanson =

Australian horticulturalist, author, and television and radio personality

Jane Edmanson OAM
- Born: 21 October 1950 (age 75); Australia
- Citizenship: Australian
- Education: BA, Dip Ed Monash; Cert Hort, Cert Landscape Tech, Burnley
- Occupations: Horticulturalist; Television presenter Author
- Years active: 1989–2025
- Employer: ABC
- Known for: Presenter on Gardening Australia (1990–present)
- Television: Sow What; Good Morning Australia; Gardening Australia
- Awards: OAM 2004

Jane Marion Edmanson OAM (born 21 October 1950) is an Australian horticulturist, author, and television and radio personality. Edmanson is best known across Australia as the longest serving presenter for the ABC TV program Gardening Australia, being on the show from its beginning in 1990, until her retirement in 2025.

== Early life ==
Edmanson was raised on a citrus farm in Buronga, New South Wales, near Mildura. This was where Edmanson started building her knowledge of horticulture and environmental care; including salt management and under-tree irrigation, observing her parents in the 1970s. Her family later moved to the Melbourne suburb of Caulfield, which led to Jane attending Lauriston Girls School. Teaching studies at Monash University were followed by certificates in horticulture and landscape technology at Burnley College of the University of Melbourne.

== Career ==
After a teaching posting at Dimboola, Edmanson started at the Victorian Schools Nursery as a Nursery Hand in 1976, then moved up over 15 years to Deputy Director.

Edmanson's early career included working through a range of jobs in the retail plant nursery industry, and she became a partner with friends in the suburban Bell Street Garden Centre retail nursery in Preston, Victoria.

Edmanson has written and co-authored books on gardening and horticulture; and has written regularly for Gardening Australia Magazine. She leads gardening tours in Australia and internationally. Edmanson is Patron of the Royal Horticultural Society of Victoria, among other public interest roles.

=== Broadcast media ===
In 1989 Edmanson replaced Kevin Heinze as presenter for ABC TV's Sow What. Edmanson was a founding presenter at Gardening Australia and has continued in the role. Another television role was six episodes on Good Morning Australia in 2005. Edmanson moved on to add weekend gardening talkback radio in Victoria to her broadcast list with 3AK, 3MP and 3AW over 28 years.

In November 2025, Edmanson announced her retirement from Gardening Australia, finishing up presenting on the show on 28 November. She was the longest serving presenter on the show, and left as the only original presenter, having been on the program since its beginning in 1990.

== Filmography ==
- Hotel Sorrento (1995), Radio Announcer

=== Television ===
- Sow What ABC TV
- Gardening Australia, 1990-2025, presenter
- Good Morning Australia, 6 episodes 2005

== Works ==
- The Australian garden : a classic guide to design planting and care. By Jane Edmanson and Lorrie Lawrence. Ringwood, Vic., Viking O'Neil, 1992; ISBN 0670866679
- The New Zealand garden. By Jane Edmanson and Lorrie Lawrence. Auckland, N.Z., Viking Pacific, 1993; ISBN 0670852406
- Jane Edmanson's favourite plants (also titled Favourite plants). By Jane Edmanson. Port Melbourne, Vic., Lothian, 1995; ISBN 0850917069
- Cheap and easy propagation. By Jane Edmanson. Melbourne, Lothian, 1991; ISBN 0850914639
- Jane Edmanson's working manual for gardeners : a month-by-month easy-reference guide to practical tasks to do in the garden (also titled Working manual for gardeners). By Jane Edmanson. South Melbourne, Vic. Lothian Books, 2003; ISBN 0734400500
- From the ground up : a complete garden guide for Victorian gardeners (also titled Complete garden guide for Victorian gardeners). By Jane Edmanson. Adelaide, South Australia, Neutrog Australia Pty Limited, 2009; ISBN 0980705711

== Awards ==
- 2004 Order of Australia "For service to horticulture, particularly through the promotion of environmentally sustainable gardening practices, and the encouragement and education of young gardeners."
- 2013 Honorary Life Membership of the Horticultural Media Association of Victoria for "outstanding service to horticulture and the media"
- 2016 Gold Laurel and Hall of Fame Award, Horticultural Media Association Australia
- 2016 Golden Wattle Award, Australian Institute of Horticulture
