= Jerry Coleby-Williams =

Australian television presenter

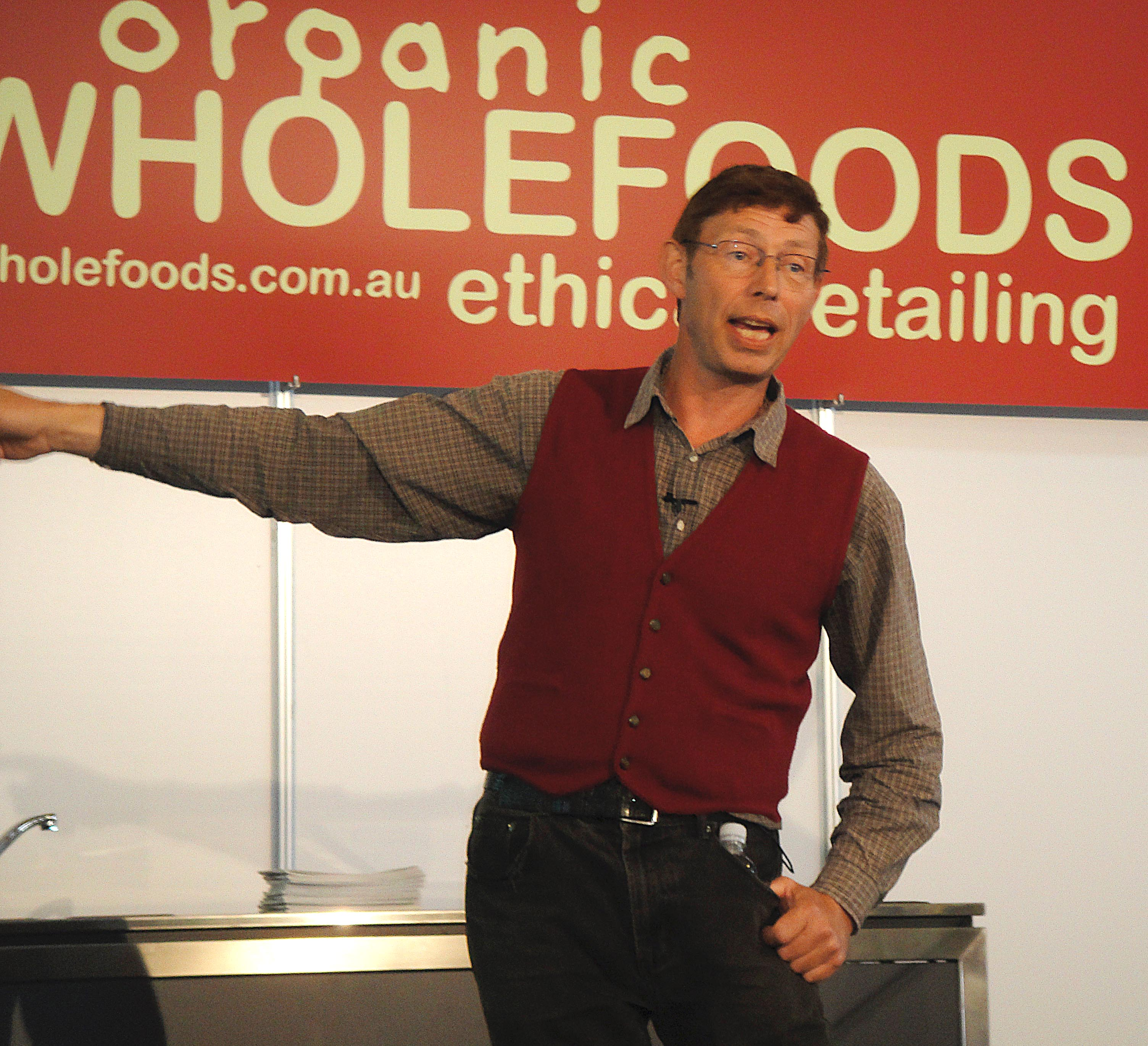
- Jerry Coleby-Williams in 2009
- Born: London, United Kingdom
- Occupations: Conservationist, horticulturalist, television and radio personality
- Employer: ABC
- Television: Gardening Australia
- Website: jerry-coleby-williams.net

Jerry Coleby-Williams is an English–Australian conservationist, horticulturalist, plant curator and television and radio personality. He has been a presenter on ABC TV’s Gardening Australia since 1999. He is the director of The Seed Savers' Network and an Executive Member of the Queensland Conservation Council.

== Early life and career ==
Coleby-Williams was born in London. He first trained with the Royal Horticultural Society before going on to study a Diploma in Horticulture at the Royal Botanic Gardens, Kew. He then worked in a variety of horticultural positions around London in the private and public sector. In 1992 he emigrated to Australia, following his ongoing passion for West Australian wildflowers. This led to his work at the Royal Botanic Gardens, Sydney as Senior Horticultural Supervisor for Displays and Connections. In this position he researched and designed the Garden's Rare and Threatened Plants Garden, which in 1999 received an award of excellence from the Australian Institute of Horticulture.

In 2003 he moved to Brisbane, Queensland in order to establish a sustainable house and garden. This house – "Bellis" - provides a model for ways in which urban Western citizens can reduce their ecological footprint, and adapt to climate change and peak oil.

Coleby-Williams is extensively involved in publishing about gardening in Australia. He is the horticultural editor of Organic Gardener magazine. He was also the consultant for content and one of the writers of the book, Gardening Australia - Flora: the gardener's bible, which is Australia’s largest illustrated plant dictionary.

Jerry Coleby-Williams is best known for his contribution to environmentalism. His model of sustainable horticulture provides a bridge between conservation and horticulture. In 2009 he won the Australian Savewater Awards for the Built Environment Category. He is also noted for his discovery of a new plant species, the Harlequin Bell (Darwinia polychroma), which is an endangered species from Western Australia.
