= Village Community Co-operative =

The Village Community Co-operative
- Formation: late 1970s
- Type: Co-operative; permaculture project
- Purpose: Sustainable living; permaculture; community education
- Headquarters: Prospect, South Australia
- Location: Kuipto Forest, south of Meadows, South Australia
- Coordinates: 34.8830°S 138.5930°E
- Region served: South Australia
- Products: Village Store; Village Natural Technology Systems
- Fields: Permaculture; renewable energy; community workshops
- Affiliations: CANE; Friends of the Earth

The Village Community Co-operative was established in the City of Prospect near Adelaide, South Australia in the late 1970s. The co-operative was established as a multiple occupancy permaculture project at Kuipto Forest, south of Meadows. The community held fairs and meetings in town, field days and workshops at Kuipto and in Prospect.

The Co-operative was originally run from a house on Braund Rd, Prospect. The house had a shop front which was opened as The Village Store. This evolved into Village Natural Technology Systems with a focus on solar, wind, sustainable house design, permaculture, books and workshops.

Village Natural Technology Systems moved to Prospect Road, Prospect in the early 1980s and the Co-operative owned store was opened by the Honorable John Bannon, Premier of South Australia, on November 26, 1983

The Village Community Co-operative was also active in the anti-nuclear movement collaborating with CANE and Friends of the Earth to produce Your carry anywhere anti - uranium songbook for Australia.

== See also ==
- Gardening in Australia
