= Carnival of Flowers =

Floral festival in Toowoomba, Queensland, Australia

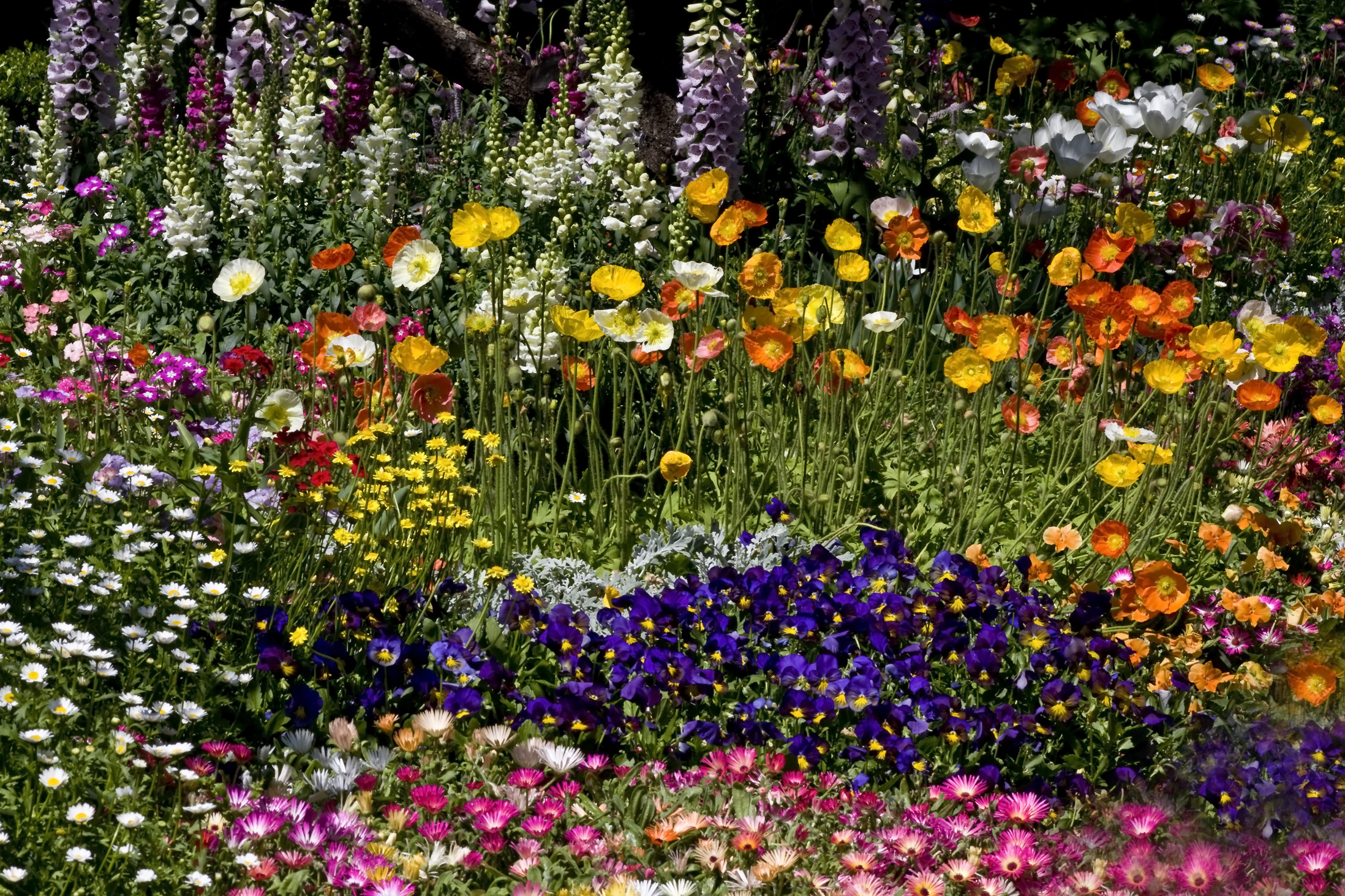
Mixed flowers, 2009

The Carnival of Flowers is an annual event in Toowoomba, Toowoomba Region, Queensland, Australia, where public and private gardens are on display to the public.

== History ==
In a public meeting in the Toowoomba town hall in September 1949, a decision was made to revive the garden competitions and festivals that had ceased during World War II. The first Carnival of Flowers was held in October 1950 and was a resounding success, with more than 50,000 people lining the main street to watch the opening parade. This heralded eight days of festivities focused on Toowoomba's beautiful gardens, both public and private. Money raised from the carnival went to local charities. The following year, the date of the carnival was moved to September, to coincide with the school holidays. Since then, the carnival has continued every year and is visited by thousands of people from around the state and the country. It is Queensland's longest running annual festival.

Laurel Bank Park is featured as a main attraction during the carnival with the Council planting thousands of flowers in the park for the event. In the 1951 souvenir brochure, the park was included on the official programme with a band scheduled to play in the park on Sunday afternoon. In subsequent souvenir brochures, the park was also featured as an attraction not to be missed.

In 2020 during the COVID pandemic, the carnival was held for the full month of September rather than the usual 10 days as part of the COVID-safe plan, which had all venues unfenced and outdoors to enable social distancing. Over 200,000 people attended the carnival.

The largest crowd at the festival was 360,000 in 2022.

== See also ==
- List of festivals in Australia
- Gardening in Australia
