= Melbourne International Flower and Garden Show =

Coordinates: 37°48′24″S 144°58′16″E

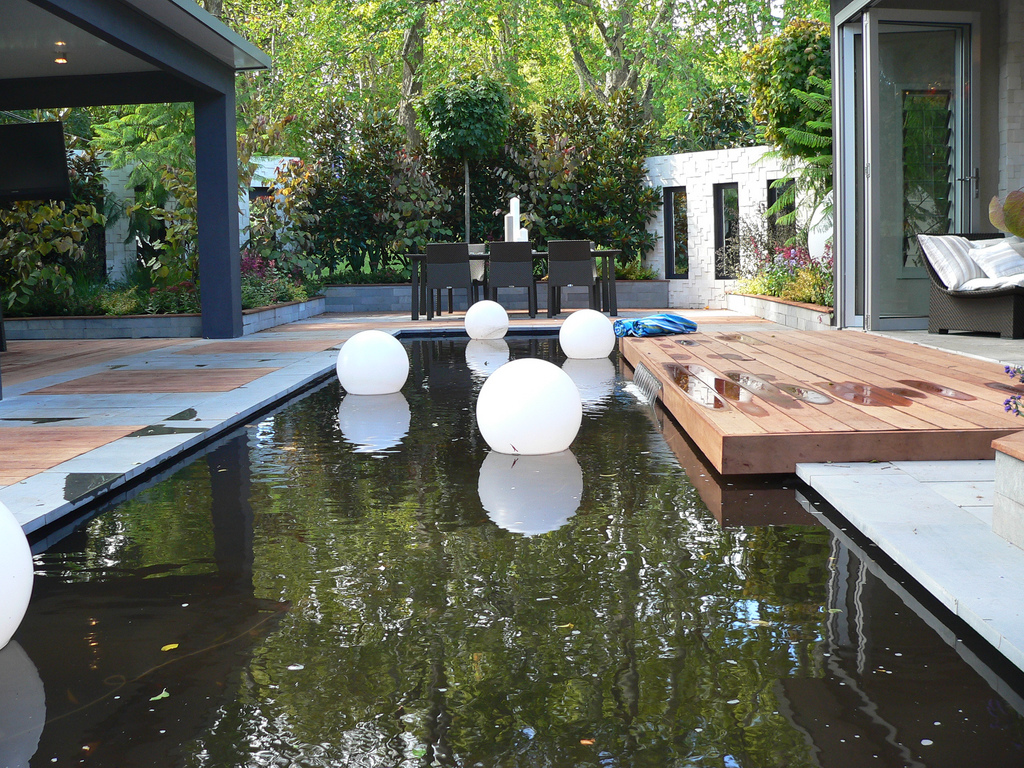
2008 Gold Show Garden Award winner "Reflections", designed by Christian Jenkins Design

The Melbourne International Flower and Garden Show is a flower show held annually since 1995 in early April each year except 2020, in Melbourne, Australia. It is located in the World Heritage Site of Carlton Gardens and the Royal Exhibition Building. It is the largest horticultural event in the southern hemisphere, attracting over 100,000 visitors.

This show went on a one-year hiatus in 2020 due to the COVID-19 pandemic in Australia.

== See also ==
- Gardening in Australia
