= Col Campbell =

Australian elevision and radio presenter

- Born: Colin Campbell; 30 October 1933; New Zealand
- Died: 23 August 2012 (aged 78); Sunshine Coast
- Occupations: Television and radio presenter
- Television: Gardening Australia
- Children: 4

Colin "Col" Campbell (30 October 1933 – 23 August 2012) was a presenter on Gardening Australia, a TV show on the Australian Broadcasting Corporation. He was also a presenter on Brisbane radio station 4BC as the "Gardening Guru" of weekend mornings, in which he answered a wide range of questions from callers. Campbell began his radio career in 1983, television in 1985 and newspaper in 1991.

== Early life ==
Campbell was born in New Zealand in 1933. His post school years involved a number of different jobs: grocer's assistant in a small country town in New Zealand, sales representative, stock and station agent, and auctioneer. Eventually employed by a fertiliser company, he gained experience with plants through his time spent conducting fertiliser trials and involvement with farmers' meetings. Throughout this period he studied as a mature student at Lincoln College, then part of the University of Canterbury, receiving a Diploma in Horticulture. Subsequent studies included a Certificate in Journalism, a Diploma in sales management, and experience gained from a public speaking course.

== "Gardening Australia" ==
A longtime presenter of Queensland-specific plants and their gardening techniques, Colin Campbell was a most popular Gardening Australia celebrity. Colin typically reported on topics such as growing Anthuriums, heliconias, cordylines, grevilleas, and drought resistant plants, used a friendly and humorous style of presentation.

Common questions usually involved worries about 'yellowing leaves' (Nitrogen deficiency) or 'funny white fluffy stuff' (mealybug). Colin's patience, humour, and down to earth explanations made his show very popular as its longevity shows; it had a loyal following in Southeast Queensland. He also regularly contributed to Brisbane printed media.

Colin was a great advocate of gardeners' rights. Although this may seem ambiguous, there was a feeling amongst many gardeners in Australia that they are being wrongly targeted as the culprits behind Southeast Queensland's (and wider Australia's) water shortage problems. Colin was advocating the health benefits that gardening has to offer people of all ages, especially the elderly, and that there are "water wise"" ways to garden. Colin in particular took it upon himself to stand up for gardeners. His goal was to show the inequities of blaming gardeners for water shortages whilst allowing other members of society such as some irresponsible members of the industrial and commercial sectors to get away with their continued abuses of the system. These views were expressed in many of his presentations and speeches and for this he was very popular with thousands of gardeners who feel vilified.

== Awards and Accolades ==
- 1991 and 2002: Nursery and Garden Industry Association Certificate of Recognition for service to the Nursery Industry.
- 1994: Appointed a Fellow of the Australian Institute of Horticulture.
- 2004: Minister for Primary Industries Award for Continued Outstanding Service to an Industry Sector.
- 2006: Meritorious Achievement Award for outstanding service and support to the Queensland Nursery Industry.
- 2006: Inducted into Hall of Fame by Landscape Queensland Inc, formerly Queensland Association of Landscape Industries.
- 2007: Awarded the Order of Australia Medal (OAM) for service to horticulture, particularly as a contributor to a range of gardening related television and radio programmes and publications.
- Varieties of hibiscus, daylily and clivia have been named in his honour.
- Patron of the Hibiscus Society of Queensland, the Queensland Herb Society, the Brisbane Daylily Society, the International Tropical Foliage and Garden Society, the Buderim Garden Club.
- Member of the Maleny Garden Club and the Royal Horticultural Society (Queensland).
- Nominee for Queenslander of the Year and Australian of the Year.

== The Brisbane Agricultural Exhibition ==
Colin attended the Brisbane Agricultural Exhibition (Ekka) every year as he presented from 4BC's booth in the Gardening Exhibition area. He was easily spotted in his trademark Akubra hat and was very popular with many of the members of the various gardening clubs, having an excellent memory for people's names and their previous gardening enquiries.

== Family ==
He was married with four sons from a previous marriage, Ian, James, Grant and Stuart. He was Grandfather to Stacy-Ann, Sara, Ashley, Grant and Helen. He died from cancer on 23 August 2012, aged 78.
