= Nerida Tyson-Chew =

- Born: 1965 (age 59–60); Sydney, New South Wales, Australia
- Occupation: Composer
- Years active: 1992–present
- Website: tyson-chew.com

Nerida Tyson-Chew (born 1965) is an Australian music composer, conductor and orchestrator, principally working in screen music. She won her first Australian Guild of Screen Composers (AGSC) Award, in 1996, for her work on Hotel Sorrento (1995) and Brilliant Lies (1996). With Hotel Sorrento she was also nominated for an AFI Award for Best Original Music Score in 1995. In 2003 she won the Screen Music Award, co-presented by AGSC with APRA AMCOS, category Best Music for a Mini-Series or Telemovie for Evil Never Dies; in 2007 she won Best Music for a Television Series or Serial for Two Twisted, episode "Delivery Man" (2006) and she won Best Music for a Documentary for Trishna & Krishna: The Quest for Separate Lives (2009) in 2010. At the APRA Music Awards of 2020 she was acknowledged for her Distinguished Services to the Australian Screen.

== Biography ==
Nerida Tyson-Chew was born in 1965. She was raised in Sydney where she attended the State Conservatorium of Music, then University of Sydney for a Bachelor of Music with honours in composition. She travelled to Los Angeles to complete a master's degree in scoring for motion pictures and television at University of Southern California. United States composer Jerry Goldsmith was one of her teachers. When composing she uses "4 Ps : Pencil, Paper, Piano and Performer." She began her career as an orchestrator for Australian composer Bruce Rowland.

Tyson-Chew gained widespread recognition for screen music composition on her first feature film, Hotel Sorrento (1995), which was directed by Richard Franklin. In the following year she worked on Franklin's next film, Brilliant Lies. She won her first Australian Guild of Screen Composers (AGSC) Award, in 1996, in the category Best Music for a Children's Television Series for the two films. She had also received a nomination for the AFI Award for Best Original Music Score for Hotel Sorrento in 1995. Her third film with Franklin, One Way Ticket (1997), was a made-for-television drama. The composer collaborated with the director on most of his subsequent projects – he also provided lyrics for some of her tunes.

She was profiled by Connections' writer, Madeleine Murray, who described the composer's process for the drama film, Under the Lighthouse Dancing (October 1997). Tyson-Chew typically starts with a description from a film's director (in this case, Graham Rattigan) and on her grand piano in her suburban home she writes the themes and melodies, some for an entire orchestra (Melbourne Symphony Orchestra). She provides the rough version for the director's approval and then plans the recording schedule for the orchestra, which she conducts. Her music is written to precise lengths to fit the film's time codes for each scene. For her work on Under the Lighthouse Dancing, Twisted Tales (1996–1997) and Fern Gully 2, she won Best Original Music in a TV Series or Film at the AGSC Awards of 1997. At the 1999 ceremony she won the Best Original Music in a TV Series or Serial, shared with Garry McDonald and Lawrence Stone, for their work on The Lost World (1999).

Yahoo Serious' film Mr. Accident (2000) was scored by Tyson-Chew. From 2002 AGSC combined with APRA AMCOS to provide the Screen Music Awards. At the 2003 ceremony she won Best Music for a Mini-Series or Telemovie for Evil Never Dies. For Trishna & Krishna: The Quest for Separate Lives she won Best Music for a Documentary in 2010. She won another Best Music for Children's Television in 2018 for The Deep episode, "The Missing". At the APRA Music Awards of 2020 in December she was acknowledged for her Distinguished Services to the Australian Screen, which recognised her long-term career as a composer in diverse forms including film, TV dramas, children's programmes and documentaries.

== Awards and nominations ==
=== AGSC Awards ===
The Australian Guild of Screen Composers (AGSC) sponsored the AGSC Awards from 1996 to 2000.

Year	Nominee / work	Award	Result	Ref.
1996	Hotel Sorrento, Brilliant Lies	Best Music for a Children's Television Series	Won	
1997	Twisted Tales, Under the Lighthouse Dancing, Fern Gully 2	Best Original Music in a TV Series	Won	
1999	The Lost World	Best Original Music in a TV Series or Serial	Won	

=== APRA Music Awards ===
Since 2002 AGSC has collaborated with APRA AMCOS to sponsor the Screen Music Awards at an annual ceremony as part of the APRA Music Awards to honour "compositions for documentaries, short films, mini-series, children's television and feature film scores." From 1992 to 2001 APRA AMCOS had provided two screen music-based categories, Best Television Theme and Best Film Score, at their annual ceremonies.

Year	Nominee / work	Award	Result	Ref.
2000	The Adventures of Sam	Best Television Theme	Nominated	
2003	Evil Never Dies	Best Music for a Mini-Series or Telemovie	Won	
2005	Tracey McBean – "Galaxy Blazers"	Best Music for Children's Television	Nominated	
2005	Anacondas: The Hunt for the Blood Orchid	Best Soundtrack Album	Nominated	
2006	Tracey McBean	Best Music for Children's Television	Nominated	
2007	Life	Best Music for a Documentary	Nominated	
2007	Two Twisted – "Delivery Man"	Best Music for a Television Series or Serial	Won	
2007	Two Twisted	Best Television Theme	Nominated	
2009	The Stamp of Australia	Best Television Theme	Nominated	
2010	Trishna & Krishna: The Quest for Separate Lives	Best Music for a Documentary	Won	
2010	Rescue: Special Ops, "Series 1, Episode 1"	Best Music for a Television Series or Serial	Nominated	
2012	Santa's Apprentice	Feature Film Score of the Year	Nominated	
2017	Herself	Most Performed Screen Composer – Overseas	Nominated	
2017	The Deep: "Tartaruga"	Best Music for Children's Television	Nominated	
2018	The Deep: "The Missing"	Best Music for Children's Television	Won	
2019	Herself	Most Performed Screen Composer – Overseas	Nominated	
2020	Herself	Most Performed Screen Composer – Overseas	Nominated	
2020	Herself	Distinguished Services to the Australian Screen	awarded	
2022	The Deep	Best Music for Children's Programming	Won	
2022	Tarneit	Best Music for a Short Film	Nominated	

=== Australian Women in Music Awards ===
The Australian Women in Music Awards is an annual event that celebrates outstanding women in the Australian Music Industry who have made significant and lasting contributions in their chosen field. They commenced in 2018.

Year	Nominee / work	Award	Result
2018	Nerida Tyson-Chew	Musical Excellence Award	Won
