= Sophie Thomson =

Australian television presenter

- Born: Australia
- Occupations: Horticulturist, author, TV and radio personality
- Employer: Australian Broadcasting Corporation
- Television: Gardening Australia

Sophie Thomson is an Australian horticulturalist, author, and television and radio personality from South Australia. She is known for her role as a presenter on the long-running ABC Television gardening show Gardening Australia.

== Early life and education ==
Sophie Thomson grew up in the Adelaide Hills town of Summertown, South Australia, where her parents ran a nursery. She grew up as an only child, her father having had children from a previous marriage who did not live with her family.

As a teenager, she worked in her family's florist shop in Blackwood, and observed her parents working hard, seven days a week. After finishing her schooling, she moved to Melbourne to study naturopathy. However, shortly before graduation her father died and she returned to Adelaide to help her mother with the nursery, intending it to be a temporary stay.

== Career ==
=== TV and radio ===
After Thomson and her mother built up the business, the family nursery was sold in 1997.

Thomson then developed a career in the media, talking and writing about gardening. Sophie began featuring as a gardening expert on radio, and became a series regular on the 1990s TV show AM Adelaide.

Thomson has been a presenter on ABC TV's Gardening Australia since the mid-2000s, and is also a radio talk show host on ABC Radio Adelaide.

=== Writing ===
Thomson writes for major newspapers and magazines and authors books on gardening. Her focus is on the role gardening can play to enhance individual and community wellbeing.

Her books include:

- From the Ground Up – A Complete Guide for South Australian Gardeners
- Sophie's Patch (2018)

=== Home and other garden projects ===
Thomson created a 2-acre (0.81 ha) garden from a dry paddock in the Adelaide Hills over 10 years, documenting the process in a book in 2018, Sophie's Patch, which became a bestseller.

Her subsequent major project is the regeneration of Shingleback Farm in Sedan, South Australia. As of March 2026, she was making a documentary about her work to transform the property, with the working title Sophie Thomson's Shingleback Farm.

Thomson also works as consultant to a wide range of clients, on sizes ranging from small home gardens to the considerable property of Government House in Adelaide.

== Other roles and activities ==
=== Community work ===
Thomson has assisted communities affected by natural disasters, such as in the aftermath of the 2019–20 bushfires on Kangaroo Island, when she raised over A$100,000 to support the community, and helped them to establish four community gardens. She also educates people about the health and environmental benefits of gardening.

She was involved in the "Native Bee BNB" project, in which eight Adelaide suburban councils built bee hotels for Australian native bees along the River Torrens.

In 2024–5 she was working with Anglicare SA helping to create landscaping and gardens for young adults leaving state care to live in youth housing in the south-western suburbs.

=== Boards and memberships ===
As of 2026 Thomson is a board member of the South Australian Botanic Gardens and State Herbarium, and the patron of Butterfly Conservation South Australia, Duck Flat Community Garden, Friends of Waite Arboretum, Beekeepers' Society of South Australia, and the Cactus and Succulent Society of SA. She is also an ambassador for Horticultural Therapy SA.

=== Other work ===
Thomson is also a popular public speaker, hired for various events around Australia.

== Recognition and awards ==
Thomson has earned a number of accolades, including:

- 2009: From the Ground Up – A Complete Guide for South Australian Gardeners, Best General Gardening Book, Laurel Awards for Horticultural Media of Australia
- 2022: Pelzer Prize, for her environmental efforts (awarded by Green Adelaide, named after August Wilhelm Pelzer)
- 2023: Listed on the South Australian Women's Honour Roll
- 2024: Inspiring South Australian Women's Award

== Personal life ==
Thomson married Richard Elston, and they first lived in a chapel that they converted, in Ashton in the Adelaide Hills. They subsequently bought a home called Hamlyn Cottage, situated on a 3-acre (1.2 ha) property in Mount Barker, also in the Adelaide Hills, in 2011. They lived there with some of their five children, and several animals. Elston created metal sculptures on the property, and the garden, which was opened to the public twice a year, became known as "Sophie's Patch". They sold this property in 2022, as urban development grew around it.

The couple separated after selling their home, with Sophie first moving to a rental property in Crafers with their youngest three children. She subsequently moved to Shingleback Farm in Sedan.
