= Almond Blossom Festival =

The Willunga Almond Blossom Festival is an annual arts, social, and entertainment festival held every year for a week beginning on the last weekend in July in Willunga, South Australia, Australia.

== History ==
In the mid-1960s, almond cultivation was the community's main source of revenue, and the spectacle of over 1,300 acres of pink and white almond blossoms attracted increasing numbers of visitors throughout the month of July. Capitalizing on the tourism, the people of the Willunga District began the festival in 1969 to raise money to replace the old Willunga Town Hall and other facilities. Over several weeks, dozens of buses toured the district's hundreds of acres of blossom.

Initially, Devonshire teas, consisting of homemade scones and jam, were provided by the Willunga High School. Within a few years, the Festival week became so popular that over 500 barbecue lunches a day were being cooked by the local Lions Club along with a similar number of Devonshire teas. Locals baked cakes and made sandwiches, and volunteers participated in the cleanup effort. Homemade almond soup became the trademark Willunga Festival delicacy.

== Festival Ball ==
The highlight of the festival was the Festival Ball and the crowning of the Almond Blossom Queen. The first Almond Blossom Festival Balls were held in the Old Town Hall, which quickly became inadequate for the 600 or more attendees at the Ball. Participants raised money though dinners, fashion parades, street vendor stalls and raffles. Later, Miss Almond Blossom and Miss Charity were chosen at a cocktail party prior to the Ball with the help of VIP judges.

The South Australian Tourist Bureau eventually established the last week of July as the official time for the annual festival. The festival's parade has become one of the largest street parades in South Australia.

== See also ==
- Gardening in Australia
