= Angus Stewart =

Australian horticulturist

- Born: New South Wales
- Education: Sydney University
- Occupations: Horticulturist, author, television presenter
- Television: Gardening Australia

Angus Stewart is an Australian horticulturist, gardening author and former television presenter on Gardening Australia.

Stewart was born in country New South Wales and graduated from Sydney University with a First Class Honors Degree in Agricultural Science and Environmental Horticulture and worked extensively in the nursery and cut flower industries ever since.

As a professional horticulturalist Stewart has spent a lifetime working with and breeding Australian native plants to make them more gardener friendly. In January 2016, among his many achievements as a plant breeder, he released his new Tall and Tough Landscape range of Kangaroo paws.

Stewart debuted on ABC Radio 702 as a regular guest on the John Doyle (aka Rampaging Roy Slaven) afternoon program. Dubbed “Doctor of the Dirt, Surgeon of the Soil, Professor of the Paddock”, Stewart continued on this program for five years before joining a range of other presenters and is now a regular guest on ABC and talk back radio throughout Australia.

As well as being a former presenter on ABC TV's Gardening Australia he also made guest appearances on various other TV programs including Channel 7's Better Homes and Gardens.

In addition to his work in the media, Stewart is an experienced international speaker, tour leader and consultant for rural and urban developments.

Stewart is an Honorary Research Associate at the Australian Botanic Garden Mt Annan where he is domesticating Australian natives from the wild. Recognizing that Australian wildflowers are a highly desirable commodity in Australia and overseas, much of Stewart's work at Mt Annan is focused on preserving rare wildflowers through cultivation.

Stewart has been widely acknowledged for his contribution to our knowledge of Native Plants.

He has written several books on gardening, including Gardening on the Wild Side, Let's Propagate! and The Waterwise Australian Native Garden. Currently he is a brand ambassador for a raised garden bed company, Vegepod.

Stewart produces regular newsletters and articles on his website, which also hosts a Plant Database which is free to access.

Stewart is also quite active on Facebook, Instagram and YouTube providing content on native plants, composting, worm farming and much more.
