= Ben Thomas (actor) =

Australian actor

- Occupation: Actor

Ben Thomas is an Australian actor. For his performance in Hotel Sorrento he was nominated for the 1995 Australian Film Institute Award for Best Actor in a Supporting Role.

Roles he has played include Troy in the 1995 film Hotel Sorrento and Pete Twist in Round the Twist, a role he took over when all the Twist children were recast due to a three-year break between the first two seasons of the show.
