= Edward Primrose =

Australian composer, writer, and musical dramaturge

Edward Primrose (born 1950) is an Australian composer, writer, and musical dramaturge. He trained as a composer at ANU School of Music in Canberra, Australia, under the composers Larry Sitsky, Don Banks and Donald Hollier. Primrose has written orchestral works, chamber works, electro-acoustic music, and musical theatre works. He has also written film scripts, theatre and radio plays. He has conducted opera (Il Trovatore, The Magic Flute, La Belle Héléne) and orchestral recordings (Sydney & Melbourne Symphony Orchestras). He married Dr Jo Violet in 2021.

== Career ==
While resident in Paris in the 1980s, Primrose was commissioned by the Pompidou Centre to compose the music to Tony Oursler's video installation Spheres of Influence (1985). He founded the Paris Performing Group (1986), directed The Woman from American Express (Paris, 1986) for theatre, wrote and directed the play Otto (Paris, 1987) and composed for TVCs and documentaries.

With the Australian Guild of Screen Composers (AGSC), Primrose helped Martin Armiger initiate music as a subject within the Australian Film TV & Radio School, becoming a Composer in Residence in 1995. He was then appointed as the school's first lecturer in music for film (AFTRS (1999-2000). He returned as lecturer (2006-2013).

Primrose was the founding Artistic Director of Camera Camerata (Sydney, 1998) with the Australian Youth Orchestra - a project that brought together composers, filmmakers, orchestral players and technicians to record the music for films as well presenting them as a live concert. He also lectured on music and sound at Queensland Conservatorium, Griffith Film School, plus universities in Sydney, Newcastle and Melbourne.

Primrose acted in short films and TVCs. He wrote, directed, edited and composed the film Kill Only This One (2006). He wrote, directed and composed Ray and Ponce for radio, (Soundproof, ABC Radio National, 2014). His original music for theatre and film includes Medea (1994); Mysteriyaki (2000); Aria de mezzo carattere (2000); and for radio, Brother Boy (ABC Radio Drama, 2005); and Ghost Words (ABC Radio Drama, 2006); He composed music for the films Reverence (2000); Humanimation (2001) and The Dancer from the Dance (2013) that were nominated for best music for documentary (AGSC/Australasian Performing Right Association (APRA)), and A Contramano (2016).

Primrose was awarded a PhD in 2014 from the University of Newcastle, with a thesis concerning musical dramaturgy. He wrote, composed and directed a production of "The Art of Lies and Obfuscation" (2019) for the Melbourne Fringe Festival. The work combines live acting together with music and video. The sequel "Snipers" was completed in 2023. Also completed was the 5 act comedy/farce "The Wife of Empedocles".
