= Gardening Australia =

Australian lifestyle television program

- Genre: Lifestyle
- Presented by: Peter Cundall (1990–2008); Stephen Ryan (2009–2011); Costa Georgiadis (2012–present)
- Country of origin: Australia
- Original language: English
- No. of series: 34

Production
- Running time: 30 minutes (1990–2017); 60 minutes (2018–present)
- Production company: ABC

Original release
- Network: ABC
- Release: 16 February 1990 – present

Gardening Australia is an Australian lifestyle television program which suggests and promotes organic and environmentally friendly ways of gardening. It is created by the Australian Broadcasting Corporation and airs on ABC TV, as of 2021 in an hour-long weekly show each Friday evening.

A monthly magazine, Gardening Australia, was spawned by the show.

== History ==
The series has its origins in 1969 as It's Growing, with five minute segments broadcast ahead of the Sunday night news on ABT2 in Hobart. It was hosted by Peter Cundall, an experienced gardener with a passion for growing plants using organic methods. He had hosted a gardening talkback segment on ABC radio in Hobart since 1967. It was renamed Landscape in 1972 and extended to 15 minutes per episode.

The format was adapted into Gardening Australia in 1990, broadcast nationally with the format expanded to 30 minutes per episode. It was still hosted by Cundall with other gardening experts from around Australia. Stephen Ryan succeeded Cundall in 2009. After three years as host, Ryan's contract was not renewed by ABC. Costa Georgiadis was announced as the new host in December 2011 for the 2012 series.

Its 1500th episode aired on 15 November 2024.

== Presenters ==
In addition to the host, each episode contains segments which are recorded across Australia with local presenters.

=== Current presenters ===
As of 2026 the presenters are:

- Josh Byrne (WA)
- Jerry Coleby-Williams (QLD)
- Millie Ross (VIC)
- Jane Edmanson (VIC)
- Sophie Thomson (SA)
- Clarence Slockee (NSW)
- Tammy Huynh (NSW)
- Hannah Moloney (TAS)

=== Past presenters ===
Presenter	Years active	State
Peter Cundall	1990–2009	TAS
Colin Campbell	1990–2011	QLD
John Patrick	2002–2017	VIC
Angus Stewart	2004–2016	NSW
Meredith Kirton	2006–2009	NSW
Stephen Ryan	2009–2011	VIC
Leonie Norrington	2003–2010	NT
Mary Moody	c. 2000	NSW
Melissa King	c. 2005	NSW
Tino Carnevale	2007–2022	TAS
Jane Edmanson	1990–2025	VIC

=== Guest presenters ===
Guest Presenter	Year	State
Indira Naidoo	2017	NSW
Carolyn Blackman	2017	VIC
Paul West	2018	VIC

== Segments ==
Cundall had a segment called Pete's Mailbag where viewers could ask questions or send in photographs or letters about their own gardens.

The show has several segments, which include all forms of gardening, from sculptural and artistic gardens to vegetable growing and xeriscaping. Most segments are filmed on location.

The program has an Ask It/Solve It section where people can submit their garden questions/problems to be answered by the presenters.

The 6 Bed Rotation Vegetable Crop (formerly 'Pete's Patch') at the Royal Tasmanian Botanical Gardens is still in the show, now called 'The Vegie Patch' with Tino Carnevale presenting.

The Vegie Guide is a new feature which suggests a range of vegetables that can be planted each month, in the broad climate zones around Australia.

== Spinoffs ==
=== Gardening Australia Junior ===
In 2023, the ABC announced a brand new Gardening Australia spinoff series titled Gardening Australia Junior, a gardening series for kids that would air on Friday nights at 7:05 pm and feature 20 episodes. Costa Georgiadis hosts the program and is featured alongside Gardening Australia presenters Clarence Slockee, Hannah Moloney and Tammy Huynh.

=== Awards ===
Year	Award	Category	Result	Ref.
2024	TV Week Logies	Best Children's Program	Nominated	

== Magazine ==
Gardening Australia is a monthly magazine published by the ABC and marketed by ABC Commercial, featuring articles by presenters on the show.

== Awards ==
Gardening Australia won the Australian Academy of Cinema and Television Arts (AACTA) Audience Choice Award for Favourite Entertainment Show in 2021, and the AACTA Best Lifestyle Program in 2022 and 2024.

Year	Award	Category	Result	Ref.
2025	TV Week Logies	Best Lifestyle Program	Nominated	

== See also ==
- List of longest-running Australian television series
- List of programs broadcast by ABC (Australian TV network)
- List of Australian television series
