= Peter Cundall =

English-born Australian horticulturalist (1927–2021)

Peter Cundall AM
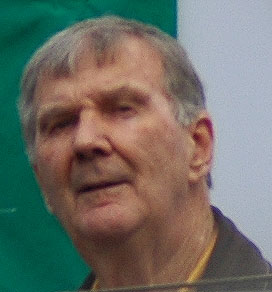
- Cundall in 2007
- Born: Peter Joseph Cundall; 1 April 1927; Manchester, England
- Died: 5 December 2021 (aged 94); Tasmania, Australia
- Citizenship: Australia
- Occupations: Soldier; Horticulturalist; Conservationist; Radio presenter; Television presenter
- Years active: 1969–2019
- Known for: Host of Gardening Australia (1989–2008)
- Television: Gardening Australia
- Awards: Australian Humanist of the Year (2006); Member of the Order of Australia (2007); Churchill Fellowship (1974)

Peter Joseph Cundall, AM (1 April 1927 – 5 December 2021) was an English-born Australian horticulturalist, conservationist, author, broadcaster and television personality. He lived in Tasmania's Tamar Valley, and until 2008, at the age of 81, presented the ABC TV program Gardening Australia. Starting in 1967, he presented what is believed to be the world's first gardening talkback radio segment. He was made a Member of the Order of Australia in 2007 "For service to the environment, particularly the protection of wilderness areas in Tasmania, and to horticulture as a presenter of gardening programs on television and radio."

Cundall was an environmentalist and pacifist. He became a household name to Australian gardeners. In a 2008 issue of Reader's Digest, he came eighth in a poll of the 100 most trusted Australians.

== Early life and military service ==
Cundall was born into an impoverished home, "the poorest of the poor", in Manchester, England, on 1 April 1927, as the second of six children. Two of his brothers died when he was young. His father was an alcoholic and battered his mother. This put Cundall off alcohol forever. He was sent to a Catholic school, but never believed the dogma he was taught. His head teacher called him a "steady lad who tries hard". He left school at age 12 after only three years of formal education, but straight away had a love for knowledge, books and reading. He worked as a milk boy and a tram conductor. Near the end of World War II, Cundall joined the British Army's Parachute Regiment. He was stationed in various countries in post-war Europe in France, Austria, Germany, Italy and Yugoslavia; and in the Middle East in Egypt and the British Mandate for Palestine. During these travels, he visited many private and public gardens and parks to learn more about plants and landscaping practices covering a wide range of climatic conditions. He was also stationed at a liberated concentration camp and said the things he saw and heard had a deep impact on him.

In 1946, Cundall was stationed in south-east Austria at Sankt Paul im Lavanttal where he was guarding captured Nazi Waffen-SS troops. He was enticed across the border into Yugoslavia by a beautiful girl named Angela, and was arrested by Marshal Tito's forces after she disappeared. He was sentenced without trial to four years' imprisonment for espionage, but was released into Trieste, Italy after six months in solitary confinement in a prison in Ljubljana, after pressure from the British government led to his release.

Eager to hasten his emigration to Australia, Cundall enlisted in the Australian Army in 1950, believing that he was enlisting for a non-combat role as a librarian. He was immediately posted to Korea, however, with the 3rd Battalion, Royal Australian Regiment, and once again saw action overseas as a machine gunner during the Korean War. During a year-and-a-half based in Japan, he studied Japanese garden design and rock garden construction. He gained access to many famous gardens and bonsai nurseries and regularly went to observe new gardens being built in Hiroshima, which was undergoing reconstruction after the atomic bombing in 1945.

== Political career and activism ==
Cundall was a Federal Senate candidate for Tasmania for the Communist Party of Australia in the 1961 federal election. He also supported many left wing political and environmental groups by speaking at rallies and events. He was an ardent pacifist and a keen environmentalist. He was the chairman of the Tasmanian Wilderness Society during the battle to stop the building of the Franklin Dam, and campaigned against the construction of the Bell Bay Pulp Mill. In 2003 he marched, with thousands of other Australians, in protest against Australia's involvement in the Iraq War. On 19 November 2009, Cundall was arrested by police after refusing to obey requests to move from the Tasmanian state parliament's front steps. He was protesting against and demanding a Royal Commission investigate the Gunns' Bell Bay Pulp Mill. On 3 February 2010, he pleaded not guilty to the charge of refusing to obey a police order to move away from Parliament House. After the court session, he accused Gunns and the politicians who approved the pulp mill of corruption. He was found guilty without conviction and was fined about A$47 in court costs on 11 February 2011. Despite the fine, he vowed to "continue to peacefully protest against Gunns' proposed Tasmanian pulp mill".

== Gardening and broadcasting ==
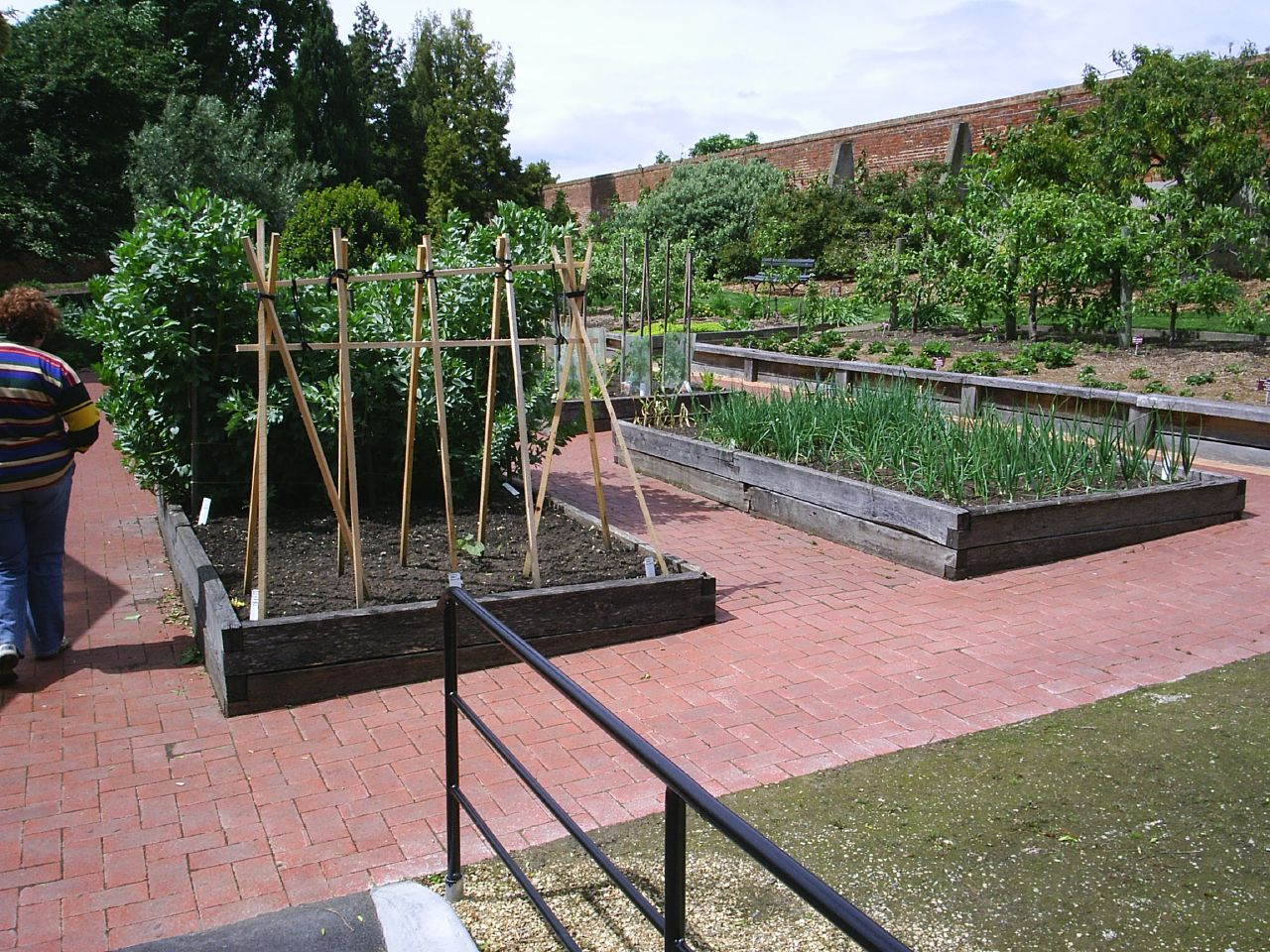
Peter Cundall's vegetable garden at the Royal Tasmanian Botanical Gardens, used in Gardening Australia

After leaving the Australian Army in 1956, Cundall moved to Tasmania, where he started his own gardening and landscaping business designing and constructing gardens in Tasmania. During this period he specialised in landscaping a large number of schools, hospitals, universities, factories, hotels, shopping centres and private gardens in Tasmania and Victoria. He was also an active founding member of the Organic Gardening and Farming Society. In 1967, he started a gardening talkback program on a Launceston radio station. In 1969, he began presenting a television gardening program for Australia's national broadcaster, the Australian Broadcasting Commission. Originally called It's Growing and then Landscape, it was another world-first which concentrated on the design and construction of new gardens in Tasmania. This show became one of the longest-running, most iconic shows in Australia—Gardening Australia.

In 1974 he was awarded a Churchill Fellowship. This enabled him to travel through the United States, Britain and Africa to study organic gardening, landscaping methods, children's playground design and the presentation of television gardening programs in colour. With WGBH Boston and the BBC he studied the way television gardening programs were made for differing climatic conditions.

In December 2007, Cundall and the ABC announced that the 2008 series would be his last. On 18 June 2008 he filmed his last Gardening Australia episode at the Royal Tasmanian Botanical Gardens. His last appearance was broadcast on ABC TV on 26 July 2008.

After his regular work on Gardening Australia, Cundall appeared for the "Help Wanted" segment on the ABC's programme Can We Help? on 11 September 2009 to help adenocarcinoma sufferer Michael Carson and his wife Dympna with rebuilding a vegetable garden in their backyard. About a month after the segment had been filmed, Carson died from his illness. Cundall was a panellist on ABC's Q+A on 25 July 2011.

== Later and personal life ==
After his retirement from Gardening Australia, Cundall continued his work as a garden writer for the Mercury and Weekly Times newspapers, as well as ABC Organic Gardener Magazine, writing predominantly about his vegetable garden while providing advice to gardeners. In June 2018, Cundall announced that he had been diagnosed with glaucoma when he was 87 and that he would eventually lose his eyesight. As such, Cundall retired as a columnist on 26 June 2018; however, he continued to present on ABC Radio in northern and southern Tasmania on Weekends with Chris Wisbey until 2019, retiring at the beginning of the new year, marking 50 continuous years of radio presenting.

Cundall died on 5 December 2021 at the age of 94 after a short illness. He had four sons from his first marriage along with two sons and a stepson from his second wife Tina, whom he married in 1980.

== Awards ==
In 2006, Cundall was named Australian Humanist of the Year. In 2007, he was awarded a Membership of the Order of Australia "For service to the environment, particularly the protection of wilderness areas in Tasmania, and to horticulture as a presenter of gardening programs on television and radio." He was also awarded Organic Federation of Australia's Lifetime Achievement Award in that year. He was the 2009 Tasmania State Recipient Australian of the Year. In 1994 Cundall was appointed Envoy for the Save the Children Fund.
