= Costa's Garden Odyssey =

- Genre: Documentary, Gardening
- Presented by: Costa Georgiadis
- Starring: Costa Georgiadis
- Country of origin: Australia
- Original language: English
- No. of seasons: 3
- No. of episodes: 24

Production
- Production locations: Sydney, New South Wales, Australia
- Running time: 45 minutes

Original release
- Network: SBS TV
- Release: 2009 – 2011

Costa's Garden Odyssey is an Australian television documentary series gardening program hosted by landscape architect Costa Georgiadis.
