= Under the Lighthouse Dancing =

1997 film

- Film poster
- Directed by: Graeme Rattigan
- Written by: David Giles; Graeme Rattigan
- Produced by: David Giles
- Starring: Jack Thompson; Jacqueline McKenzie; Naomi Watts
- Cinematography: Paul Murphy
- Edited by: David Stiven
- Music by: Nerida Tyson-Chew
- Distributed by: Village Roadshow Pictures
- Release date: 16 October 1997 (Australia)
- Running time: 94 minutes
- Country: Australia
- Language: English

Under the Lighthouse Dancing is a 1997 Australian romantic drama film directed by Graeme Rattigan, and starring Jack Thompson, Jacqueline McKenzie and Naomi Watts. It is based on a true story.

== Premise ==
Three couples travel to Rottnest Island near Perth, Western Australia for the weekend. One of the couples announces that they intend to get married and when the bride-to-be tells the others that she is terminally ill, they make sure the wedding takes place that weekend.

== Cast ==
- Jack Thompson as Henry
- Jacqueline McKenzie as Emma
- Naomi Watts as Louise
- Philip Holder as Garth
- Zoe Bertram as Juliet
- Aden Gillett as David
- Michael Loney as Father Flynn

== Reception ==
Writing for Variety, David Stratton praised the acting and production design of the film, but said that it had thin material, and that the ending was "hokey".

Australia's SBS gave the film a negative review concluding that the production "obviously wants to have an emotional impact, it just hasn't done it very successfully."

== Box office ==
Under the Lighthouse Dancing grossed $30,321 at the box office in Australia.

== See also ==
- Cinema of Australia
