= Antarctic beech =

Antarctic beech is a common name of two species in the genus Nothofagus:

- Nothofagus antarctica, native to South America
- Nothofagus moorei, native to Australia
