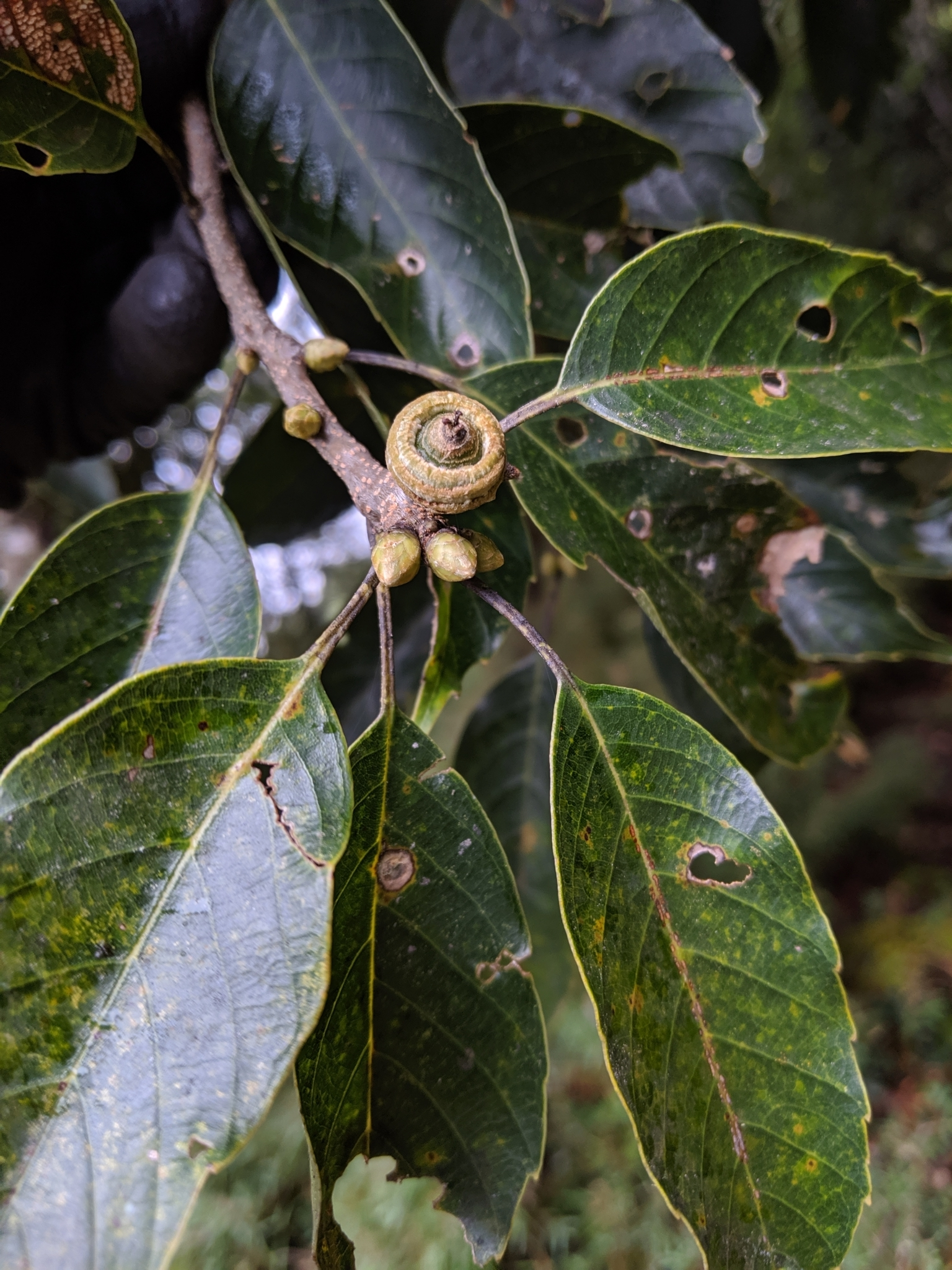

Conservation status
- Least Concern (IUCN 3.1)

Scientific classification
- Kingdom: Plantae
- Clade: Embryophytes
- Clade: Tracheophytes
- Clade: Spermatophytes
- Clade: Angiosperms
- Clade: Eudicots
- Clade: Rosids
- Order: Fagales
- Family: Fagaceae
- Genus: Quercus
- Subgenus: Quercus subg. Cerris
- Section: Quercus sect. Cyclobalanopsis
- Species: Q. morii

Binomial name
- Quercus morii Hayata 1911

Synonyms
- Cyclobalanopsis morii (Hayata) Schottky

= Quercus morii =

Species of oak tree

Quercus morii is an uncommon Asian species of trees in the beech family Fagaceae. It has been found only in Taiwan. It is placed in subgenus Cerris, section Cyclobalanopsis.

Quercus morii is a large tree up to 30 meters tall. Leaves can be as much as 10 cm long.
