= Hotel Sorrento =

- Theatrical poster
- Directed by: Richard Franklin
- Written by: Peter Fitzpatrick; Richard Franklin
- Based on: Hotel Sorrento (play) by Hannie Rayson
- Produced by: Richard Franklin
- Starring: Caroline Goodall; Caroline Gillmer; Tara Morice
- Cinematography: Geoff Burton
- Edited by: David Pulbrook
- Music by: Nerida Tyson-Chew
- Distributed by: Umbrella Entertainment
- Release date: 14 July 1995
- Running time: 112 minutes
- Country: Australia
- Language: English

Hotel Sorrento is a 1995 Australian drama film directed by Richard Franklin. Three sisters reunite in the sleepy Australian town of Sorrento after a ten-year hiatus. One of the three has written a book called Melancholy which is a thinly disguised version of their lives. The film is an adaptation of Hannie Rayson's 1990 play of the same name.

"One of the film's many fleeting reflections is an exploration of the word "melancholy" - a word that perfectly suits Hotel Sorrento's tone and pace."

== Cast ==
- Caroline Goodall as Meg Moynihan
- Caroline Gillmer as Hilary Moynihan
- Tara Morice as Pippa Moynihan
- Joan Plowright as Marge Morrisey
- Ray Barrett as Wal Moynihan
- Nicholas Bell as Edwin
- Ben Thomas as Troy Moynihan
- John Hargreaves as Dick Bennett
- Dave Barnett as Radio Announcer
- Peter O'Callaghan as Radio Announcer
- Jane Edmanson as Radio Announcer
- Bill Howie as Radio Announcer
- Sam Newman as Football Commentator
- Shane Healy as Football Commentator
- Phillip Lee as Auctioneer (voice)

== Production ==
Richard Franklin had worked for a number of years in the US, although he had lived in Australia since 1985. He was becoming frustrated with Hollywood and decided to make a film for the "art house market". He contacted his brother in law, Peter Fitzgerald, who had written a number of books on Australian theatre and asked him to recommend an Australian play which might make a good film. Fitzpatrick put forward Hotel Sorrento and Franklin loved it. He made the movie having never seen a production of the play.

== Critical reception ==
The New York Times said that "The film is steeped in a homey provincial atmosphere that is at once comforting and stifling, and that gives some substance to the talk about the complacency and materialism of Australian society and its indifference to artists." Cinephilia said "The play by Hannie Rayson, with its familiar typology of characters and Chekovian dialogue, no doubt provided pleasing entertainment in its original stage setting but as adapted by Franklin with Peter Fitzpatrick and transposed the big screen this story of a fraught family reunion of sorts looks like soapie material blown out of proportion (Meg’s line "I’m looking for Dick" is pure Number 96, albeit unintentionally so)."

=== Accolades ===
Award	Category	Subject	Result
AACTA Awards (1995 AFI Awards)	Best Film	Richard Franklin	Nominated
AACTA Awards (1995 AFI Awards)	Best Direction	Richard Franklin	Nominated
AACTA Awards (1995 AFI Awards)	Best Adapted Screenplay	Richard Franklin	Won
AACTA Awards (1995 AFI Awards)	Best Adapted Screenplay	Peter Fitzpatrick	Won
AACTA Awards (1995 AFI Awards)	Best Actress	Caroline Goodall	Nominated
AACTA Awards (1995 AFI Awards)	Best Actress	Caroline Gillmer	Nominated
AACTA Awards (1995 AFI Awards)	Best Supporting Actor	Ray Barrett	Won
AACTA Awards (1995 AFI Awards)	Best Supporting Actor	Ben Thomas	Nominated
AACTA Awards (1995 AFI Awards)	Best Editing	David Pulbrook	Nominated
AACTA Awards (1995 AFI Awards)	Best Original Music Score	Nerida Tyson-Chew	Nominated
AACTA Awards (1995 AFI Awards)	Best Sound	James Harvey	Nominated
AACTA Awards (1995 AFI Awards)	Best Sound	Glenn Newnham	Nominated
AACTA Awards (1995 AFI Awards)	Best Sound	Roger Savage	Nominated
AACTA Awards (1995 AFI Awards)	Best Sound	Gareth Vanderhope	Nominated
ASM Award	Best Original Music for a Feature Film	Nerida Tyson-Chew	Won
FCCA Award	Best Music Score	Nerida Tyson-Chew	Won
Tokyo International Film Festival	Tokyo Grand Prix	Richard Franklin	Nominated

== Box office ==
Hotel Sorrento grossed $1,215,478 at the box office in Australia.

== Home media ==
Hotel Sorrento was released on DVD by Umbrella Entertainment in September 2012. The DVD is compatible with all region codes and includes special features such as the trailer, audio commentary with Richard Franklin and a featurette titled Inside Hotel Sorrento.

== See also ==
- Cinema of Australia
