= Wildlife Service =

Wildlife Service may refer to:

- Canadian Wildlife Service
- Kenya Wildlife Service
- National Parks and Wildlife Service (disambiguation)
- National Parks and Wildlife Service (New South Wales)
- New Zealand Wildlife Service
- Queensland Parks and Wildlife Service
- Sydney Metropolitan Wildlife Service
- Tasmania Parks and Wildlife Service
- United States Fish and Wildlife Service

== See also ==
- Wildlife Services
