= Conservation in Australia =

Protection of biodiversity in Australia

Conservation in Australia is an issue of state and federal policy. Australia is one of the most biologically diverse countries in the world, with a large portion of species endemic to Australia. Preserving this wealth of biodiversity is important for future generations. 25% of Australia is managed for conservation.

Animal habitats like reefs and forests must be preserved in order to preserve the population and diversity of animal species. Conservation is vital for future study and for field research to be taken, and because biological richness is an unmeasurable aesthetic that may be developed into commercial recreational attractions.

According to Janine Benyus, the potential for advances in biomimicry in Australia is great because the extreme weather and conditions found here provide an excellent evolutionary incubator. Research on natural processes can only occur if the habitat is preserved and organisms continue to thrive.

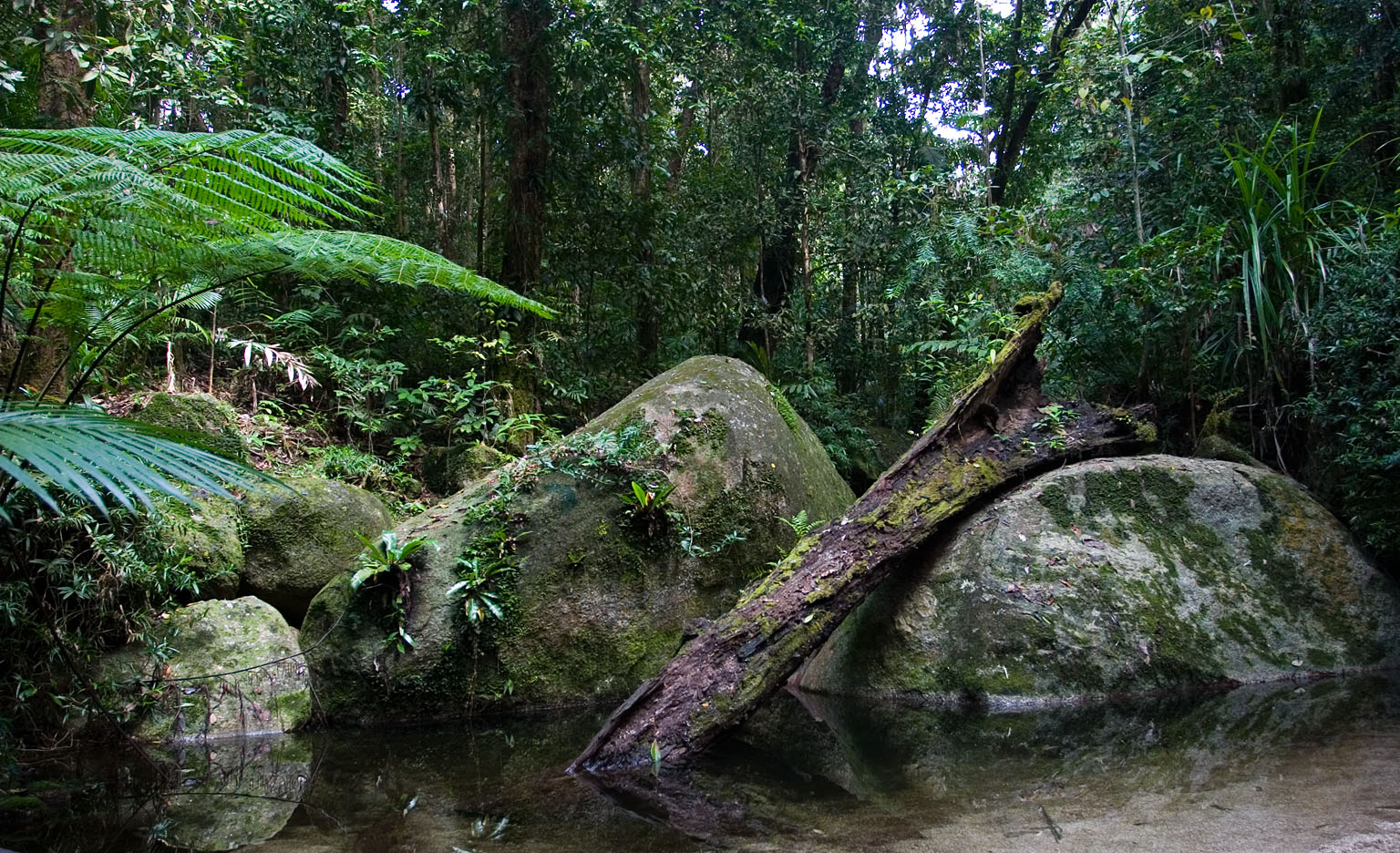
Rainforests such as the Daintree have immeasurable value.

Federal and State governments manage protected areas and national parks; a number of non-governmental organizations are also involved in conservation.

== Conservation issues ==
A key conservation issue is the conservation of biodiversity, especially by protecting the remaining rainforests. The destruction of habitat by human activities, including land clearing, remains the major cause of biodiversity loss in Australia. The importance of the Australian rainforests to the conservation movement is very high. Australia is the only western country to have large areas of rainforest intact. Forests provide timber, drugs, and food and should be managed to maximize the possible uses. Currently, there are a number of environmental movements and campaigners advocating for action on saving the environment, one such campaign is the Big Switch.

Land management issues including clearance of native vegetation, reafforestation of once-cleared areas, control of exotic weeds and pests, expansion of dryland salinity, and changed fire regimes. Intensification of resource use in sectors such as forestry, fisheries, and agriculture are widely reported to contribute to biodiversity loss in Australia. Habitat fragmentation is one of the most important factors affecting the persistence of species. Coastal and marine environments also have reduced biodiversity from reduced water quality caused by pollution and sediments arising from human settlements and agriculture. In central New South Wales where there are large plains of grassland, problems have arisen from—unusual to say—lack of land clearing.

Shark culling (the killing of sharks) currently occurs in New South Wales and Queensland (in government "shark control" programs). These programs have damaged the marine ecosystem. Roughly 50,000 sharks have been killed by Queensland authorities since 1962, including in the Great Barrier Reef. Queensland's "shark control" program has been called "outdated, cruel and ineffective". The "shark control" programs in New South Wales and Queensland have killed thousands of animals, such as turtles and dolphins. In 2018, the Humane Society International filed a lawsuit against the government of Queensland to stop shark culling in the Great Barrier Reef.

The protection of the iconic Wollemi Pine is an important conservation issue because the tree is one of the rarest in the world. There are only 46 mature individual trees remaining in the wild. The small grove of unusual conifers in a remote canyon are threatened due to its highly restricted distribution, extremely small population size, the ongoing impacts from exotic pathogens, inappropriate fire regimes, unauthorized site visitation and climate change.

When assessing biodiversity loss among Australian birds, intrinsic biological characteristics play a vital role in predicting extinction risk. Phylogenetic comparative modelling demonstrates that high evolutionary uniqueness and island endemism are key predictors of threat status for native bird species. In contrast, bird taxa that are able to take advantage of agricultural landscapes are generally less prone to extinction.

Specific issues:

- Blue Gum Forest
- Fraser Island
- Franklin Dam
- Lake Pedder
- Uranium mining in Kakadu National Park
- Plight of the Murray River system

== Legal framework ==
Conservation of the natural environment in Australia is derived from five different sources of law, namely international law, federal law, State law and local government law as well as the application of the common law.

=== International environmental law ===
International agreements that affect conservation policy in Australia.

Entry in force	Title, date, place of agreement
1948	International Convention for the Regulation of Whaling, 1946, Washington
1961	Antarctic Treaty, 1959, Washington
1975	Convention on Wetlands of International Importance Especially as Waterfowl Habitat, 1971, Ramsar
1975	Convention for the Protection of World Cultural and Natural Heritage, 1972, Paris
1975	Convention on International Trade in Endangered Species of Wild Fauna and Flora (CITES), 1973, Washington
1982	Convention on the Conservation of Antarctic Living Marine Resources, 1980, Canberra
1983	Convention on the Conservation of Migratory Species of Wild Animals, 1979, Bonn
1985	International Tropical Timber Agreement, 1983, Geneva
1993	Convention on Biological Diversity, 1992, Rio de Janeiro, leading to Australia's Biodiversity Action Plan
1993	United Nations Convention to Combat Desertification in those Countries experiencing Serious Drought and/or Desertification, particularly in Africa, 1994, Paris
1994	United Nations Convention on the Law of the Sea, 1982, Montego Bay
1994	United Nations Framework Convention on Climate Change, 1992, New York

=== Federal law ===
The primary federal law is the Environment Protection and Biodiversity Conservation Act 1999 (Cth), usually referred to as the EPBC Act.

== Protected areas ==
There are numerous protected areas in all States and Territories that have been created to protect and preserve Australia's unique ecosystems. Protected areas include national parks and other reserves, as well as 64 wetlands which are registered under the Ramsar Convention and 16 World Heritage Sites. As of 2002, 10.8% (774,619.51 km^{2} or 299,082.26 sq mi) of the total land area of Australia is within a protected area. Protected marine zones have been created in many areas to preserve marine biodiversity; as of 2002 they cover about 7% (646,000 km^{2} or 249,000 sq mi) of Australia's marine jurisdiction. In Australia forest cover is around 17% of the total land area, equivalent to 134,005,100 hectares (ha) of forest in 2020, up from 133,882,200 hectares (ha) in 1990. In 2020, naturally regenerating forest covered 131,614,800 hectares (ha) and planted forest covered 2,390,300 hectares (ha). Of the naturally regenerating forest 0% was reported to be primary forest (consisting of native tree species with no clearly visible indications of human activity) and around 18% of the forest area was found within protected areas. For the year 2015, 67% of the forest area was reported to be under public ownership, 32% private ownership and 1% with ownership listed as other or unknown.

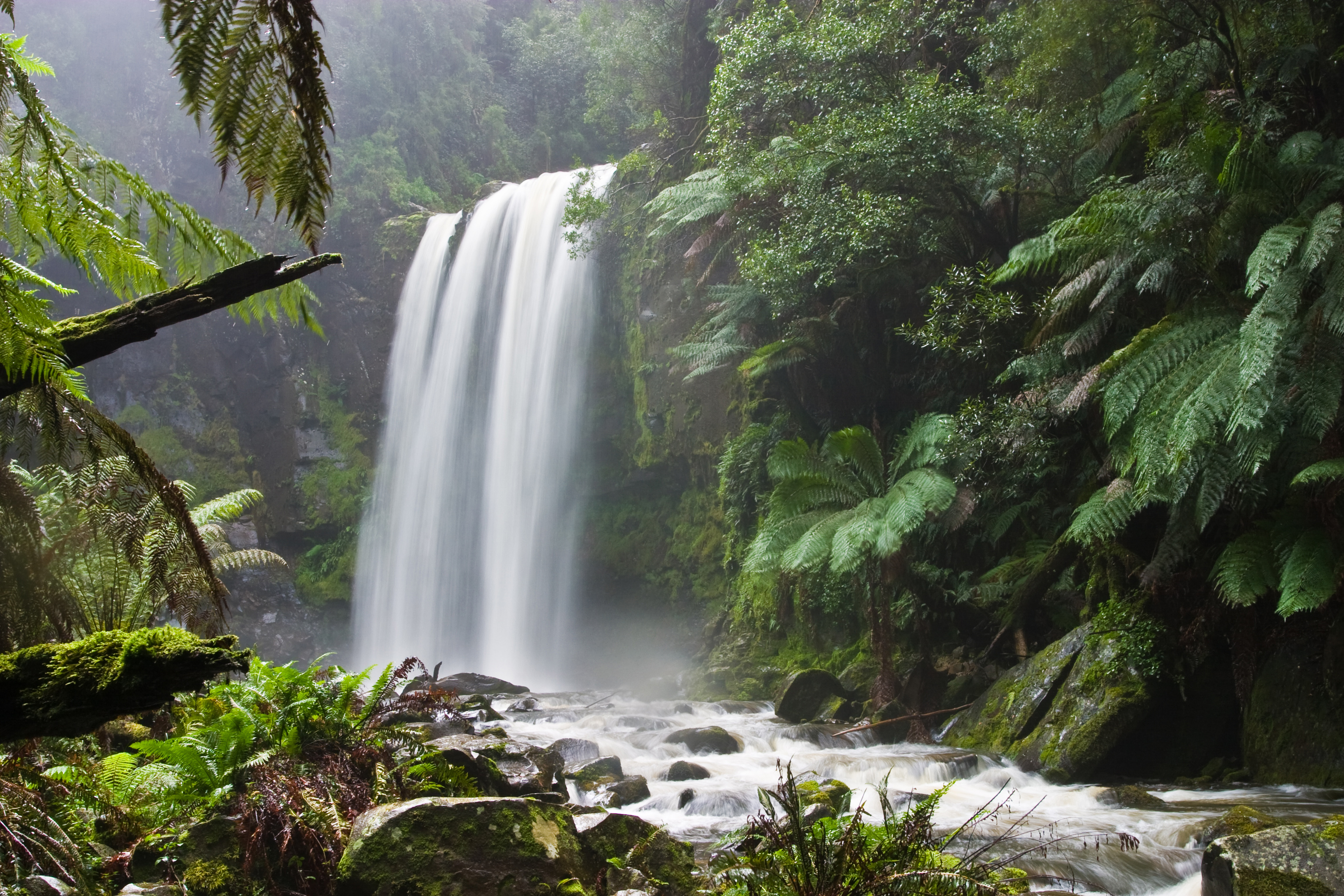
Hopetoun Falls and other unique wilderness areas are protected within reserves and parks.

Protected areas of include those managed by the federal Department of the Environment and Energy, and national parks and other protected areas managed by the states, Agencies responsible for protected areas include:

- Director of National Parks
- Great Barrier Reef Marine Park Authority
- New South Wales Department of Environment and Climate Change
- Parks Victoria
- Queensland Parks and Wildlife Service
- Department of Environment and Water (South Australia)
- Department of Environment and Conservation (Western Australia)
- Tasmania Parks and Wildlife Service
- Chief Minister's Department (Australian Capital Territory)
- Parks and Wildlife Commission of the Northern Territory

== Conservation organisations ==
A number of governmental and non-governmental organisations work in the conservation and restoration of the Australian environment.

- Australian Conservation Foundation
- Australian Koala Foundation
- Australian Marine Conservation Society
- Australian Native Plants Society
- Australian Rainforest Conservation Society
- Australian Wildlife Society
- Australian Wildlife Conservancy
- Banksia Environmental Foundation
- BirdLife Australia
- Bush Heritage Australia
- Capricorn Conservation Council
- Capricorn Coast Landcare Group
- Clean Up Australia
- Conservation Volunteers Australia
- Environment Tasmania
- Emu Park Bushcare Group
- Foundation for National Parks & Wildlife
- Green Corps
- Greening Australia
- Gladstone Conservation Council
- Invertebrates Australia
- Landcare Australia
- Land for Wildlife
- Lockyer Uplands Catchments
- National Parks Australia Council
- Natural Heritage Trust Australia
- Nature Conservation Council of NSW
- Nature Foundation
- North Brisbane Catchments
- NSW Wildlife Information Rescue and Education Service
- OzFish Unlimited
- Planet Ark
- Queensland Conservation Council
- Queensland Trust for Nature (see Avoid Island)
- Queensland Water & Land Carers
- Rainforest Rescue
- Sustainable Population Australia
- Sydney Metropolitan Wildlife Service
- Wilderness Society
- Trees for Life
- Trust for Nature (Victoria)
- Wildlife Preservation Society of Queensland
- Wildlife Warriors
- World Wide Fund for Nature#WWF-Australia

== See also ==
- Environmental movement in Australia
