= SMWS =

SMWS may refer to:

- Sydney Metropolitan Wildlife Service
- The Scotch Malt Whisky Society
