= Deforestation in Victoria =

Deforestation in the state in Australia

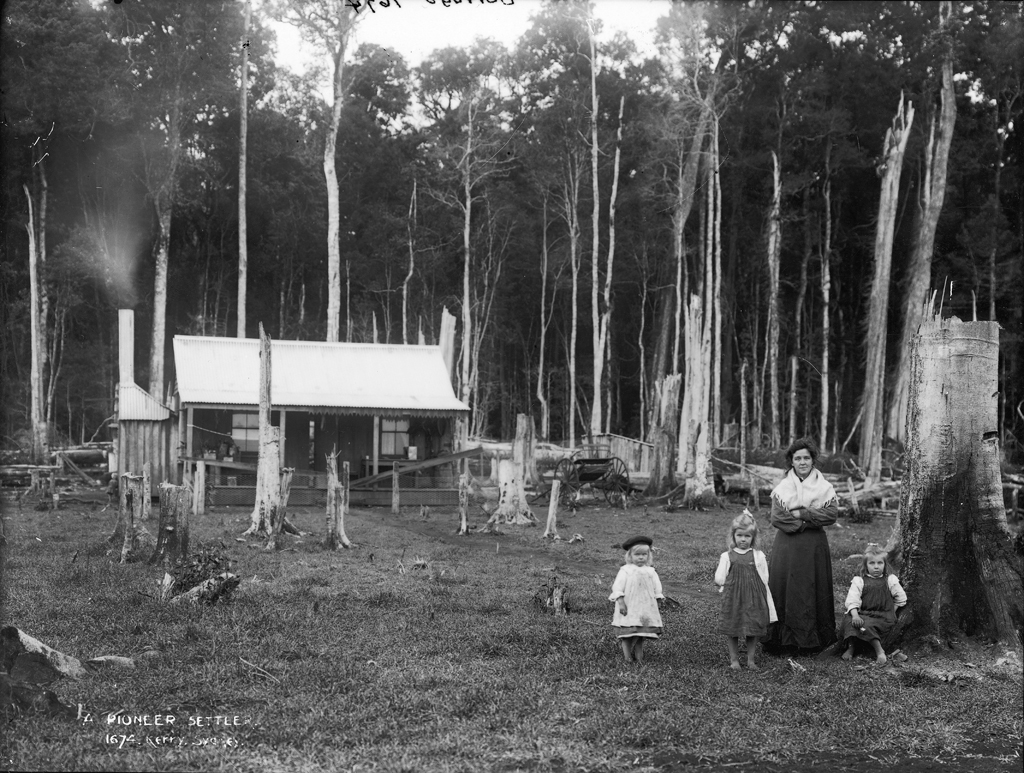
Deforestation by early settlers (circa 1895–1917).

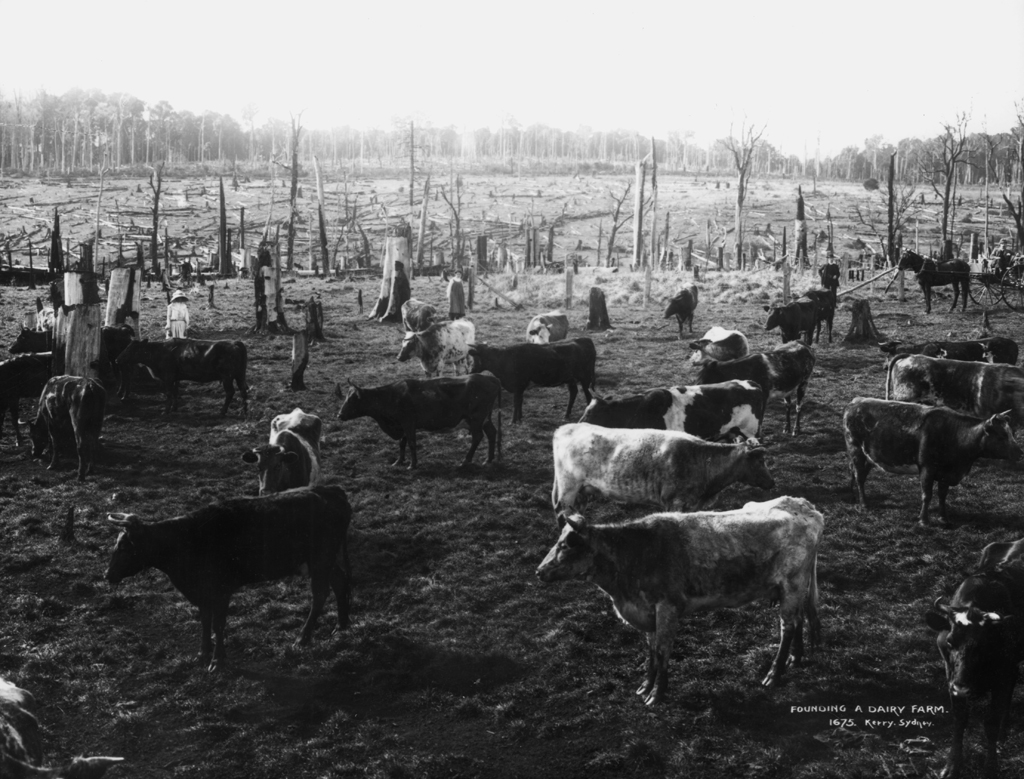
Deforestation by early settlers establishing pastures.

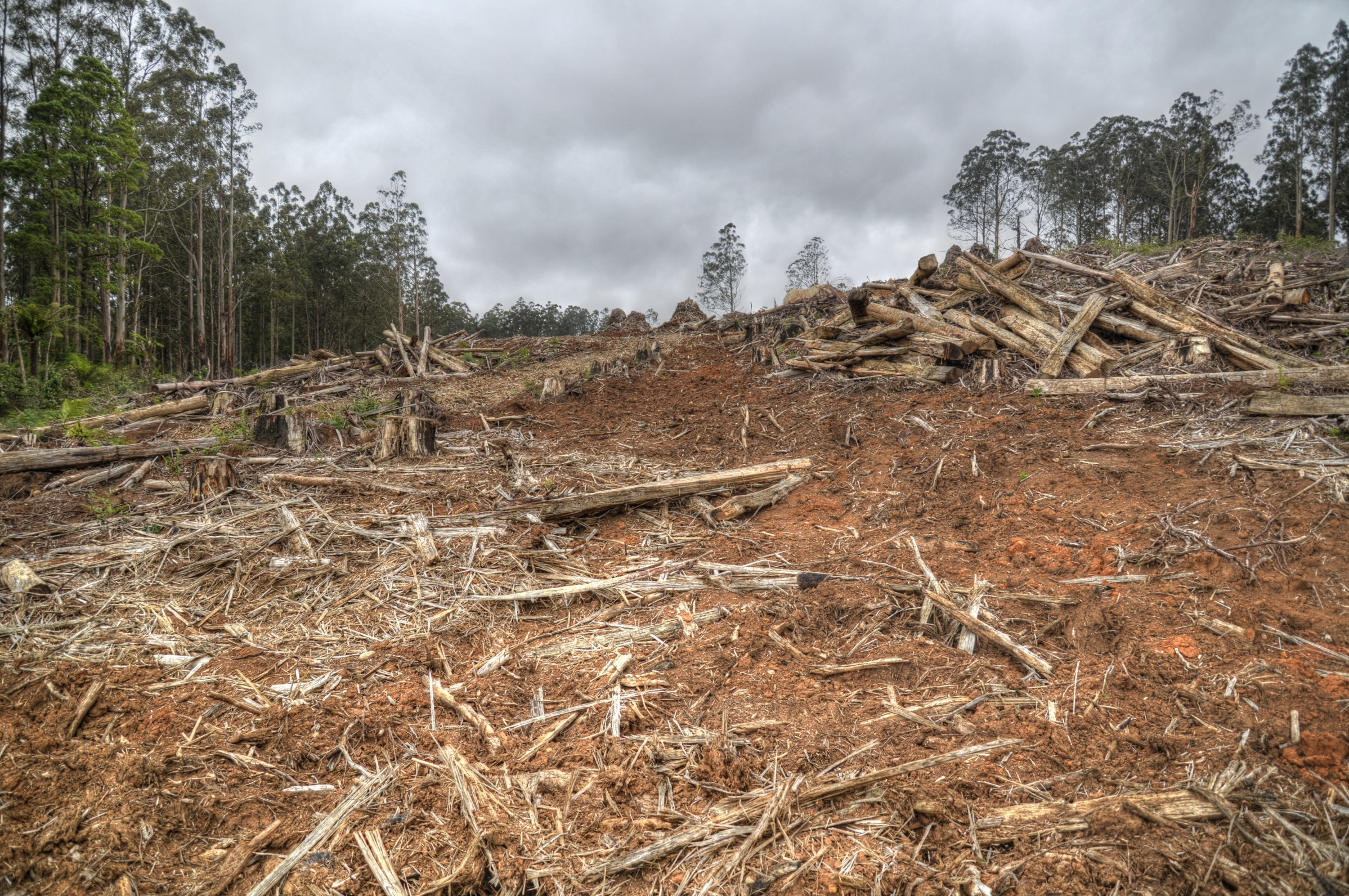
Present day deforestation in Toolangi State Forest.

The land area of Victoria, Australia is estimated to have had 88% forest coverage totaling 199,830 km^{2} in 1869 during early European colonisation of Victoria. (Note: The definition of forest for this statistic was woody vegetation over 2 metres in height and a foliar coverage (density) greater than 10%.) This was at a time between the 1861 and 1871 censuses of the colony of Victoria in which the number of inhabitants of the colony were estimated to number between 540,322 (1861) and 729,654 (1871), and the number of houses were estimated to number between 134,332 (1861) and 160,410 (1871). By 1987, deforestation had led to the forested areas of Victoria declining to 35% (79,656 km^{2}) of the total land area. From the 1980s onwards the logging and clearing of old growth native forests was challenged by environmentalists, including through the use of nonviolent direct action.

== Protection of forests ==
By 2016, the state of Victoria had formally protected 31,382 km^{2} of forested land area, equating to 14% of the land area of Victoria. A further 7,397 km^{2} of forested land area had been informally protected by 2016, equating to an additional 3% of the land area of Victoria.

In November 2017, the Victoria State Government led by Australian Labor Party (Victorian Branch) released a plan setting a target date of 2037 by which Victoria should start to experience a net gain in the extent and quality of native vegetation within Victoria. The plan noted that although deforestation had slowed since regulations were introduced in 1989, net deforestation of 40 km^{2} per year was still being experienced within Victoria.

In November 2019, the Victoria State Government led by Australian Labor Party (Victorian Branch) announced that deforestation of native forests on crown lands would be phased out by 2030. This would have the effect of plantation timber being the only timber being sourced from the land area of Victoria from 2030. Both the Liberal Party of Australia (Victorian Division) and National Party of Australia – Victoria opposed the plan to phase out deforestation of native forests by 2030, claiming the practice is sustainable. The Australian Greens Victoria campaigned for an immediate end to deforestation of native forests within Victoria.

== See also ==
- Land clearing in Australia
