= Land clearing in Australia =

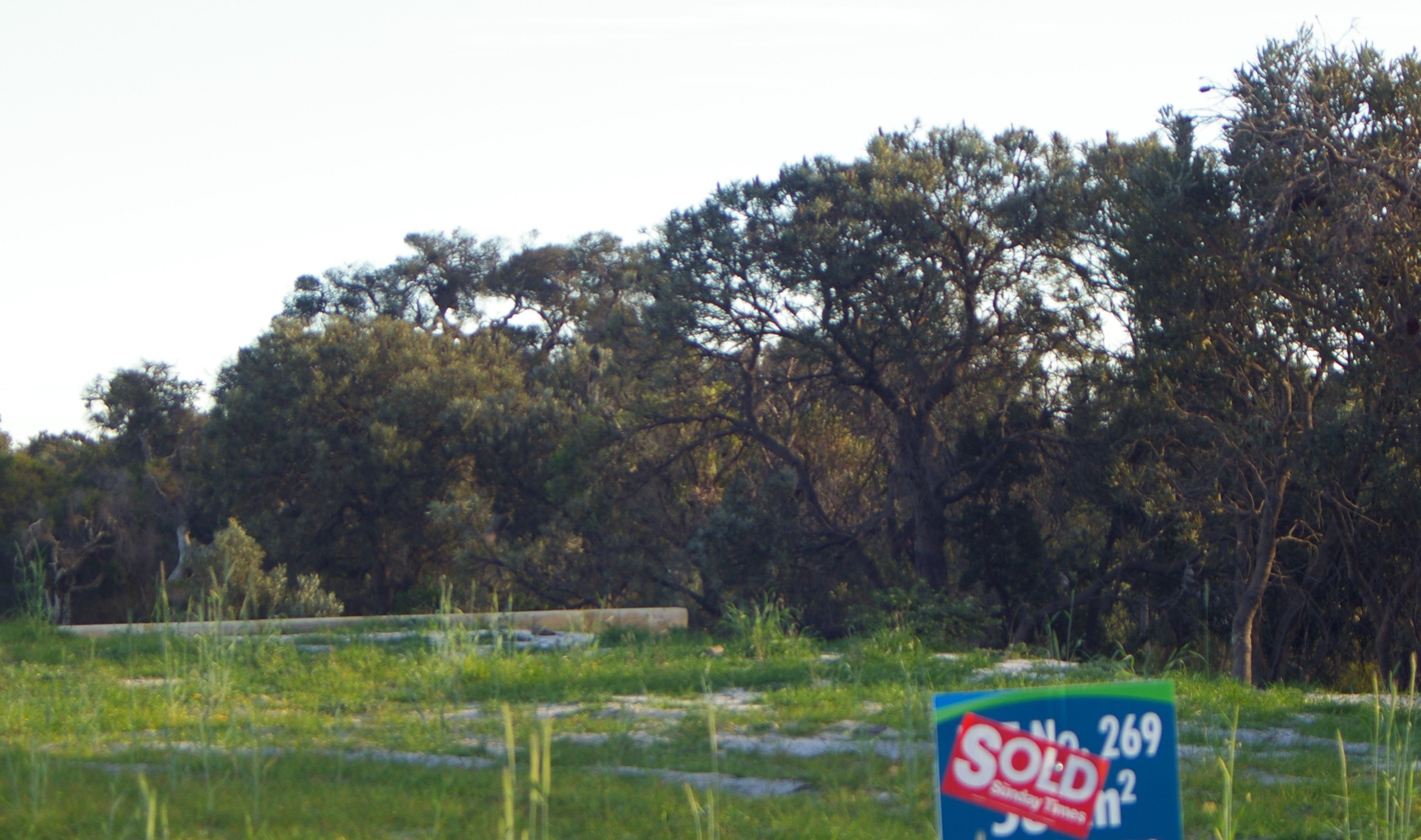
The distribution of Banksia largely coincides with areas of high population density, and large tracts of Banksia woodland are cleared for urban expansion every year. In this photo, land clearing for housing threatens the Banksia menziesii species in Canning Vale, Western Australia.

Aerial views of deforestation in Australia.

Land clearing in Australia describes the removal of native vegetation and deforestation in Australia. Land clearing involves the removal of native vegetation and habitats, including the bulldozing of native bushlands, forests, savannah, woodlands and native grasslands and the draining of natural wetlands for replacement with agriculture, urbanization and other land uses.

Land clearing remains a significant environmental issue in Australia. Conservation and government reports estimate that approximately 500,000 hectares of native vegetation are cleared each year, mainly for pasture expansion in Queensland and New South Wales. The Brigalow Belt and Mulga Lands are among the regions with the highest recent rates of clearing.

Eastern Australia is considered one of the world's global deforestation hotspots, with rates of vegetation loss comparable to tropical regions such as the Amazon. Recent studies link large-scale clearing to habitat loss, greenhouse gas emissions, and declines in biodiversity, particularly affecting species such as koalas and greater gliders.

Land clearing is regulated primarily at the state level. Queensland and New South Wales have introduced laws to limit or monitor clearing. Despite these measures, satellite data and environmental assessments indicate that unregulated and secondary clearing continue across parts of the country.

== History and trends ==
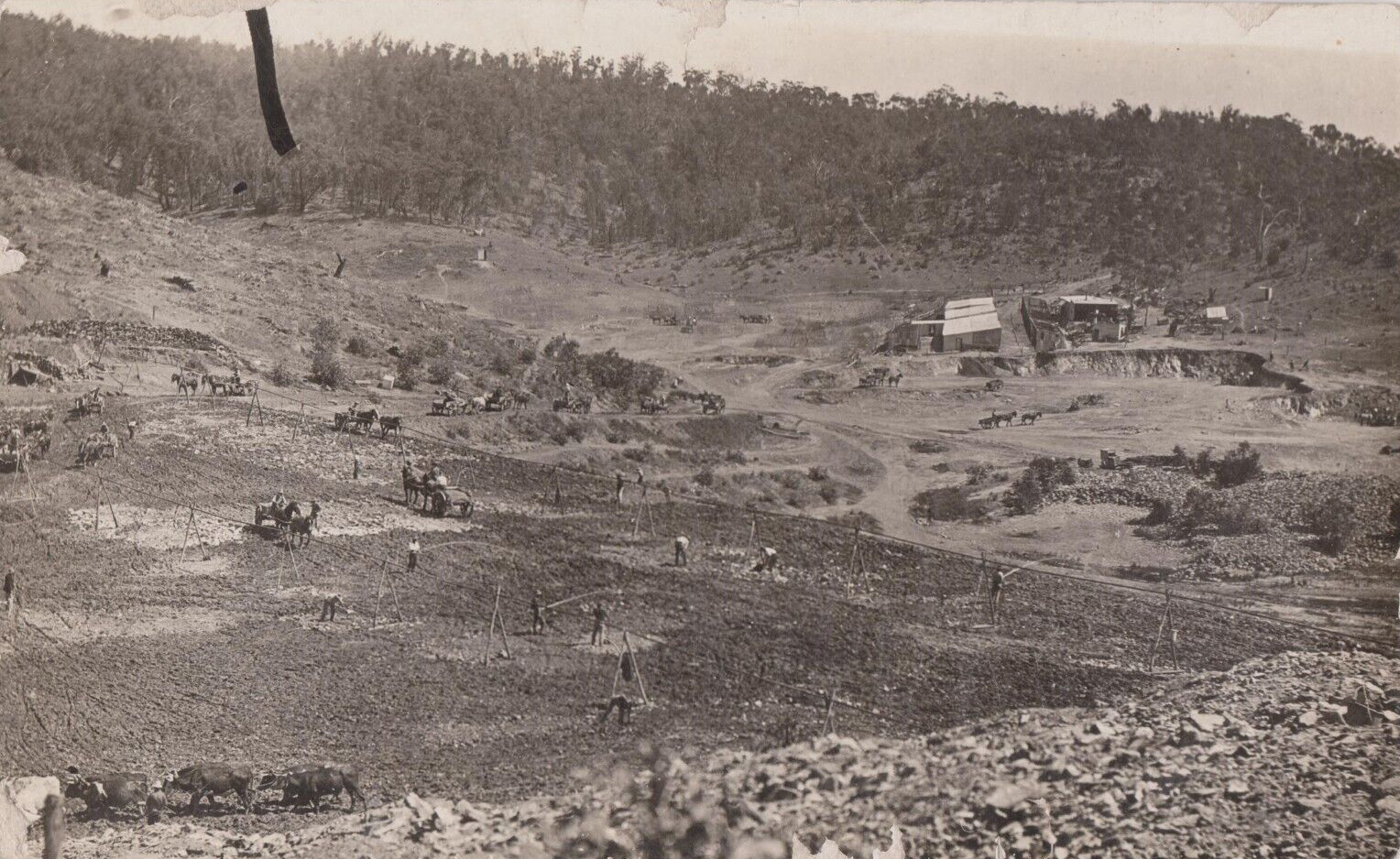
This photo shows men clearing land in Australia in the 1900s.

Land clearing in Australia began soon after European settlement, when forests and bushlands were removed to create farmland and settlements. Historically, the rural sector was viewed as an important piece of the economic fabric of Australia. Throughout the 19th and 20th centuries, governments encouraged clearing through land grants and subsidies, viewing it as a means of increasing productivity and contributing to national progress. Throughout the mid to late twentieth century, land clearing continued to be associated mostly with agricultural expansion. Technological advancements further reduced the cost and effort required to clear the land, which led to more wide-scale clearing projects at a faster rate.

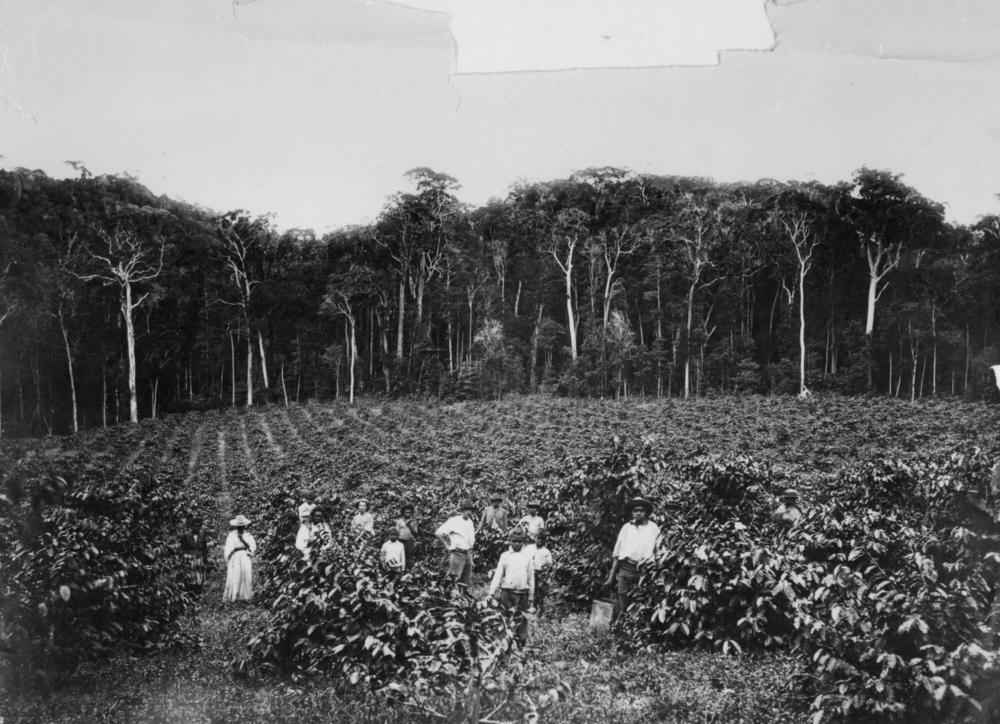
Coffee plantations in Queensland ca. 1900 contributed to the loss of a lot of native forests

Clearing in the twentieth century was also heavily influenced by financial incentives provided by the State Governments. These included tax concessions and access to land at a lower cost, which reduced the cost of clearing and made land development more economically attractive. Land clearing was also undertaken to raise land values, as cleared land held higher market values compared to uncleared land. From 1925 until 1987, the Rural Credits Development Fund aided rural development. Additional funding for rural expansion also became available through institutions such as the Commonwealth Development Bank, which provided loans that often included land development. Financial deregulation in the 1970s further increased the availability of loans meant for property development and clearing.

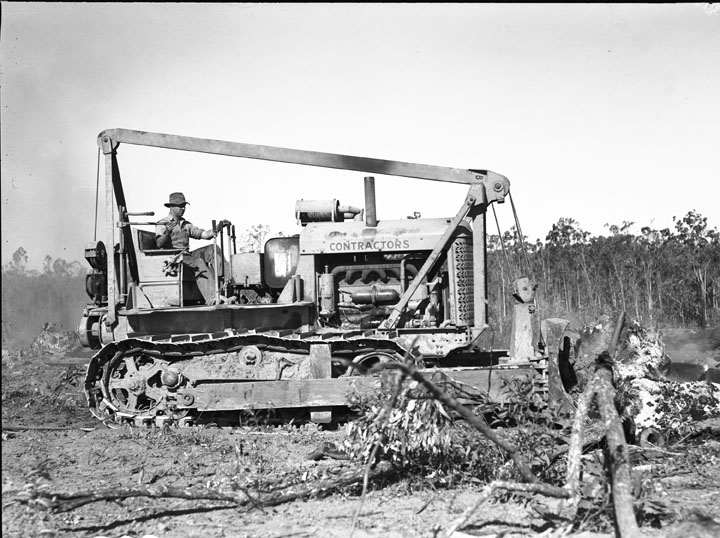
Site preparation and land clearing by bulldozer, Brisbane in the 1950s

Before to the early 1970s, landholders were able to deduct the full cost of clearing native vegetation. Then, changes were introduced in 1973, which reduced the concessions by spreading deductions over a longer period. However, since 1983, clearing costs were no longer tax deductible, and tax incentives were instead directed toward conservation efforts such as restoring native vegetation and focusing on landcare activities.Large-scale land development schemes also contributed to clearing trends, such as the Brigalow Land Development Scheme and the War Service Land Settlement Scheme, which provided low-interest bank loans and financial support programs such as drought relief assistance.

By the late 1980s and early 90s, opinions toward land management began to shift, with greater acknowledgement of land degradation and the environmental impacts often associated with extensive clearing. This coincided with the removal of many financial incentives and the introduction of stronger regulatory controls. As a result, clearing rates declined in many parts of Australia during the 1990s, although clearing continued in some regions.

== Causes ==
Every single year in Australia, land clearing is increasingly becoming a problem as it encroaches further into natural habitats. The dissipation of native biomes (e.g. forests, woodlands, wetlands, and grasslands) is not only reducing species health as well as local communities, but it is also considered a large-scale threat to the biodiversity within Australia. Land clearing in Australia is influenced by multiple factors, including agricultural expansion, urban and infrastructure development, timber extraction, bushfires and broader economic and policy incentives. Approximately 7.7 million hectares of land was cleared in a 17 year period between 2000 and 2017, which ultimately reduced the biodiversity of terrestrial threatened species according to the 2021 State of the Environment Report.

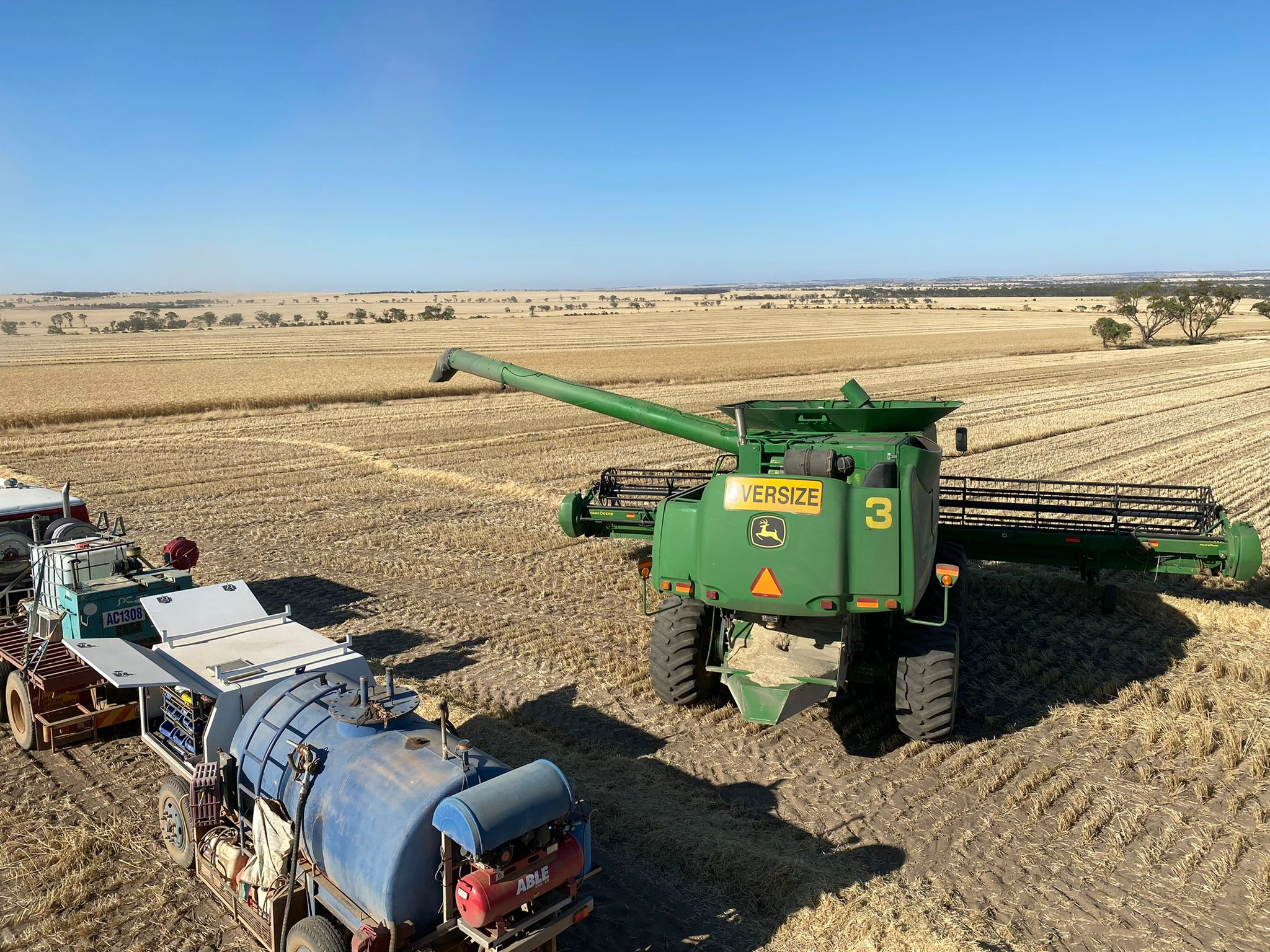
This image depicts a cleared field in Western Australia for agriculture.

=== Agriculture ===
Agricultural expansion, particularly clearing land for livestock grazing and crop production, is a primary driver of land clearing in Australia. Hundreds of thousands of hectares of native vegetation are removed each year to create pasture for cattle and sheep, and to support crops such as cotton. In Queensland, a large proportion of recent clearing, an estimated 86% in 2022-2023, was for the expansion of grazing land.

Large areas of native vegetation have been cleared to create pasture for livestock, especially in Queensland, where the majority of recent clearing has been linked to beef production. Cropping systems such as wheat production have also contributed to historic clearing in fertile regions, including parts of New South Wales.

Economic research has shown that clearing rates tend to increase during periods of favorable commodity prices, as higher potential revenue encourages landholders to expand agricultural operations.

=== Urban development ===
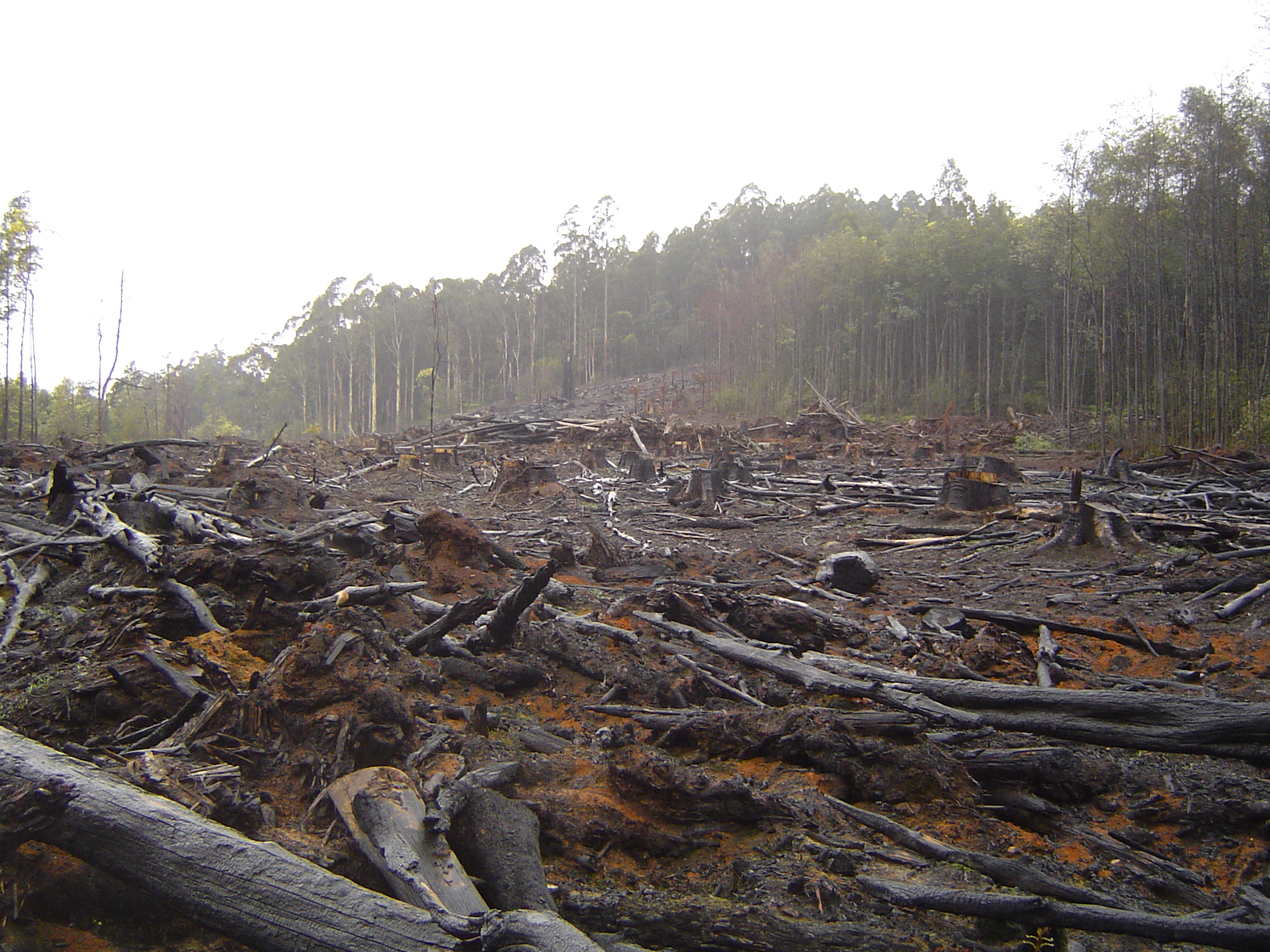
This photo shows a logged area in Toolangi State Forest in Victoria. Toolangi is one of the regions where native forests have been heavily cleared for timber production.

Urban development contributes to land clearing when native vegetation is removed to make space for housing, infrastructure, and industry related land uses. While the majority of urban expansion does occur on previously cleared land, growth in regional and peri-urban areas can also result in new clearing of native forest or woodland. Urban-related clearing often occurs in areas near major cities and regional centers where residential and commercial land demand intersects with remaining native vegetation, contributing to ongoing reductions in forest and bushland cover.

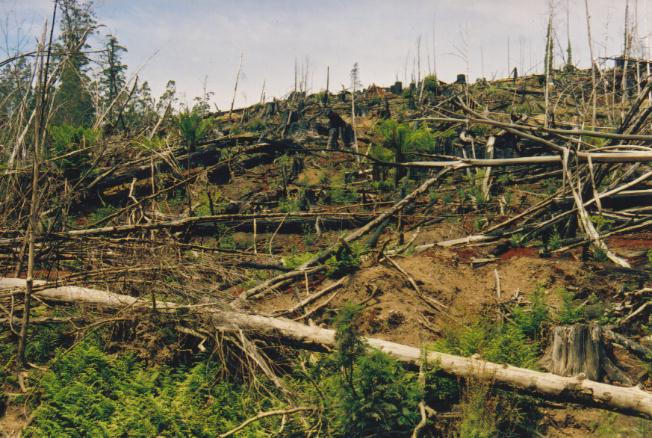
This images shows trees that have been logged in Tasmania.

=== Logging ===
Logging and the harvesting of native forest products have also contributed to land clearing in Australia. In some forest regions, large areas have been cleared for timber production, with remaining vegetation often burned or removed as part of logging operations. This type of logging alters forest structure and reduces habitat availability for native species. Native forest logging has continued, including areas where tall forests are still used for timber and wood products, despite regulatory efforts to reduce the impact.

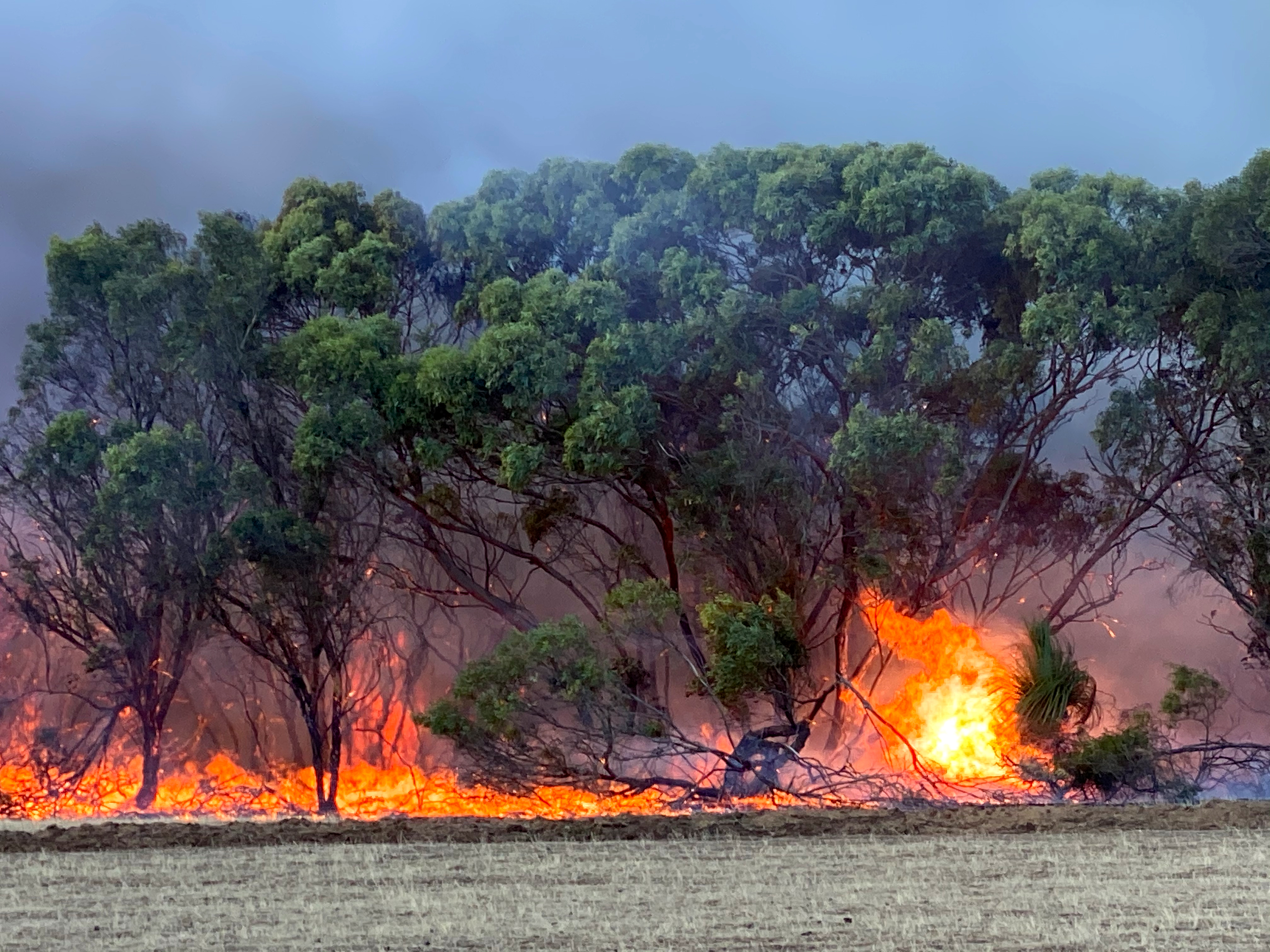
The 2019 Australian Bushfires - Kangaroo Island, South Australia

=== Bushfires and secondary clearing ===
Bushfires in Australia are frequently occurring events during the hotter months of the year. The intensifying climate in Australia is producing drier and hotter conditions, making fire seasons more destructive. The sustainability of species and biodiversity has been a problem over the years as fragmented habitats and damaged landscapes haven't had time to recover from previous fires (e.g. 2019-2020 bushfires). In some areas where these ecosystems have already been reduced in size, new fires can result in a total extermination of species populations. While fire is a natural part of many Australian ecosystems, high-severity fires can cause longer-term reductions in forest and woodland cover. In some cases, the vegetation that regrows after fire is later cleared, particularly in grazing areas where regrowth may be removed to maintain pasture. This type of secondary clearing can increase overall vegetation loss following major fire events.

=== Economic and policy incentives ===
Higher agricultural commodity prices, including cattle and crop prices, are associated with increased land clearing, as landowners tend to expand production during periods of strong market conditions. Analyses of land clearing trends in New South Wales indicate that changes in livestock and crop prices account for a substantial share of variation in clearing rates. Government management policies have also influenced clearing patterns, with regulatory changes linked to a shift away from first-time clearing and toward re-clearing of previously cleared land.

== Effects ==
Land clearing destroys plants and local ecosystems and removes the food and habitat on which other native species rely. Clearing allows weeds and invasive animals to spread, affects greenhouse gas emissions and can lead to soil degradation, such as erosion and salinity, which in turn can affect water quality.

The following table shows the native vegetation inventory assessment of native vegetation by type prior to European settlement and as at 2001–2004. (Given in units of square kilometres)

| Vegetation type | Pre-settlement total | 2005 total | Percentage lost |
|---|---|---|---|
| Forest and woodland | 4,101,868 | 3,184,260 | 22% |
| Shrublands | 1,470,614 | 1,411,539 | 4% |
| Heath | 9,256 | 8,071 | 13% |
| Grassland | 1,996,688 | 1,958,671 | 2% |
| Total native vegetation | 7,578,204 | 6,562,541 | 13% |

=== Land condition ===
As the land cover is crucial to land condition, land clearing exerts significant pressure on land condition. Removal of vegetation also leaves soil bare and vulnerable to erosion. Soil stability is essential to avoid land degradation.

=== Soil erosion ===
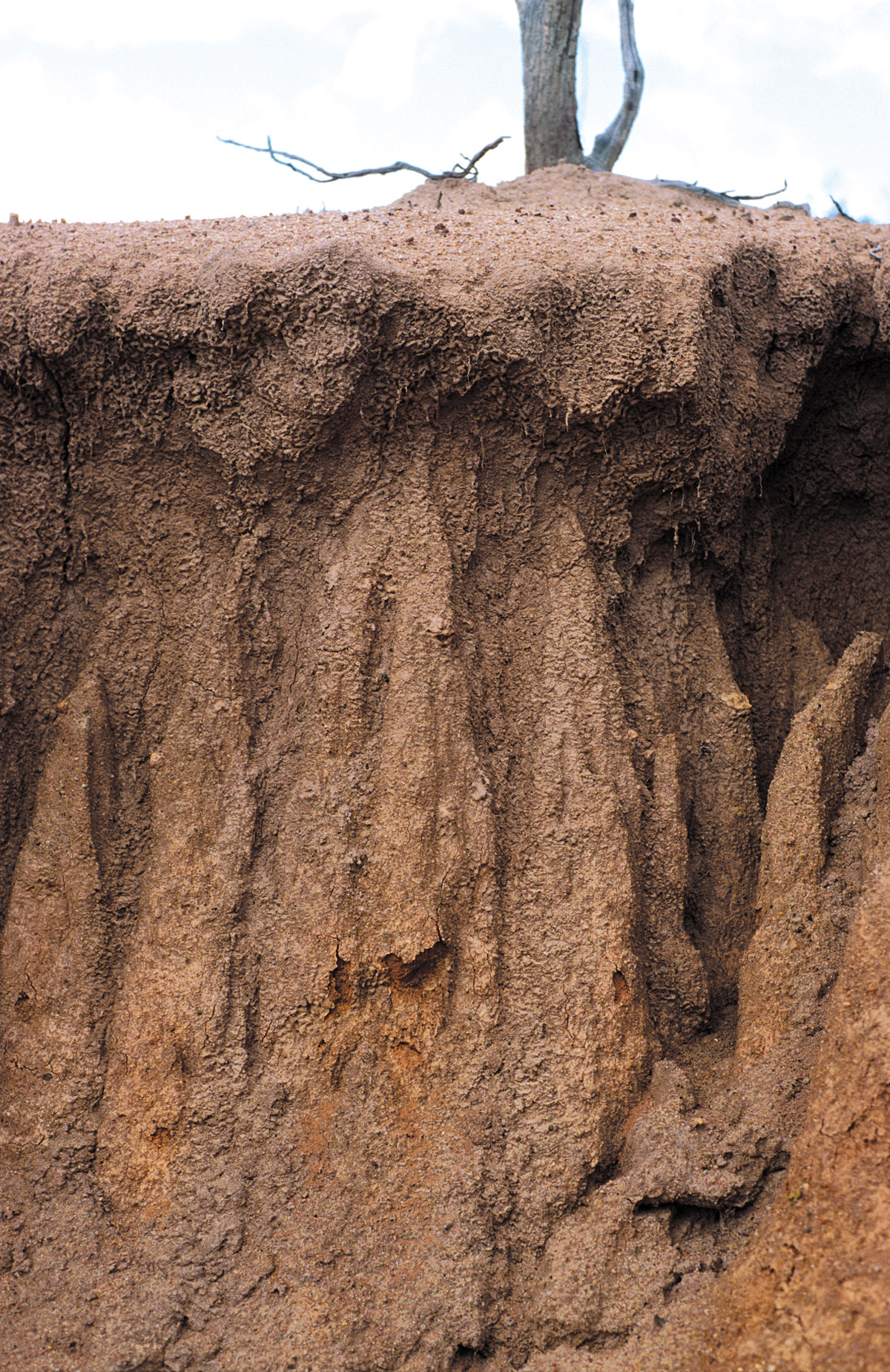
This image depicts soil erosion due to drylands salinity in Northern Queensland.

Soil erosion is very significant pressure on land condition because it undermines existing vegetation and habitats and inhibits vegetation and other biotas that inhabit the vegetation from re-establishing, thus resulting in a "negative" feedback loop. Terrestrial vegetation is a source of nutrient replenishment for soils. If vegetation is removed, there is less biological matter available to break down and replenish the nutrients in the soil. Exposing soil to erosion leads to further nutrient depletion. Soil erosion from deforested land has also affected the water quality around the Great Barrier Reef.

=== Salinity ===
Another consequence of land clearing is dryland salinity. Dryland salinity is the movement of salt to the land surface via groundwater. In Australia, there are vast amounts of salt stored beneath the land surface. Much of Australian native vegetation has adapted to low rainfall conditions, and use deep root systems to take advantage of any available water beneath the surface. These help to store salt in the earth, by keeping groundwater levels low enough so that salt is not pushed to the surface. However, with land clearing, the reduced amount of water that previously got pumped up by the roots of the trees means that the water table rises towards the surface, dissolving salt in the process. Salinity reduces plant productivity and affects the health of rivers and streams. Salinity also affects the lifespan of roads and other infrastructure, affecting the economy and transportation.

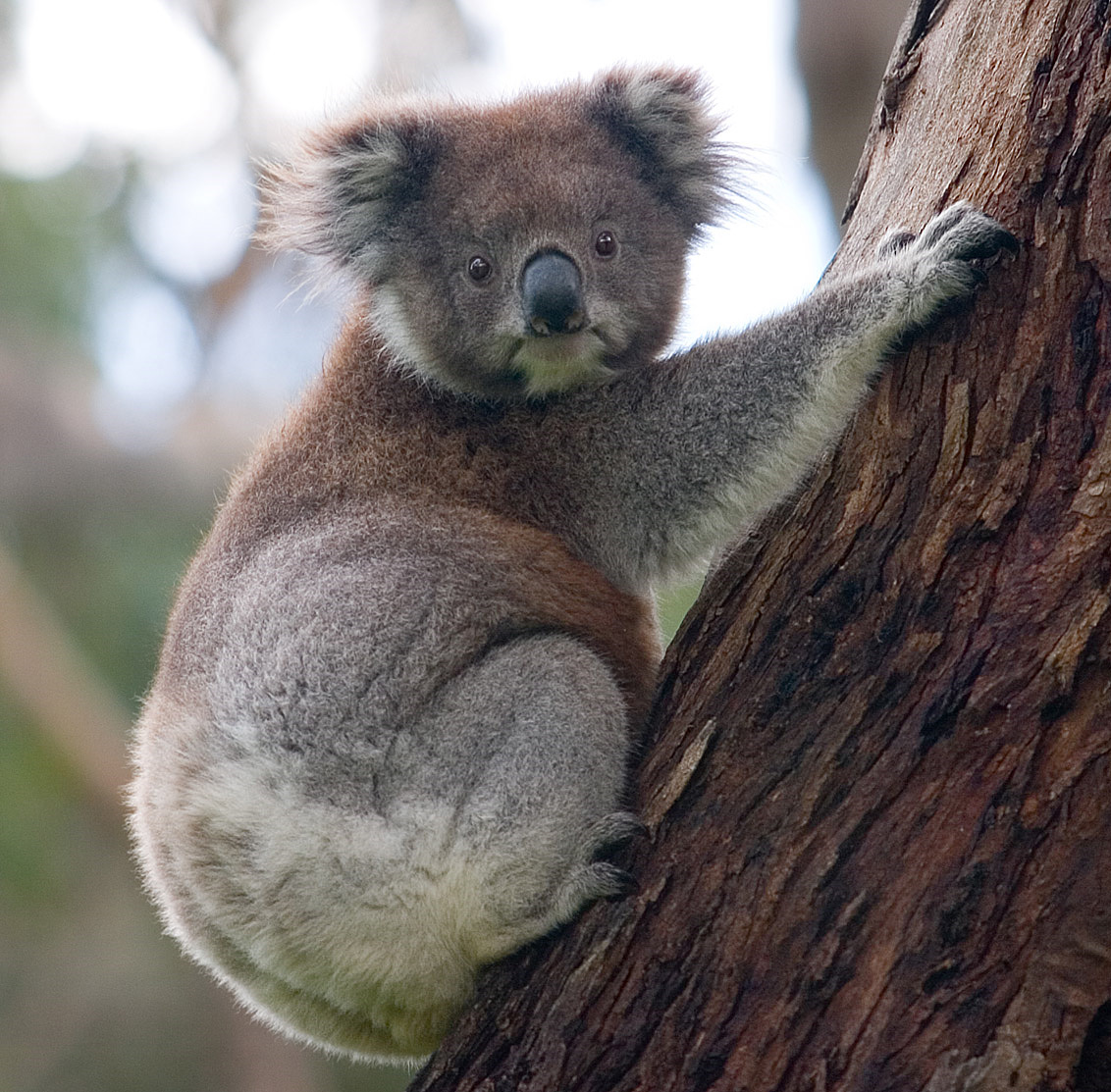
This image depicts a Koala climbing a tree in Victoria, Australia.

=== Biodiversity ===
Land clearing is a major cause of habitat loss and fragmentation in Australia and is listed as a key threat to many threatened plant and animal species. The removal of native vegetation reduces habitat availability and food and shelter resources, increasing the risk of population decline and extinction. National conservation assessments indicate that habitat loss linked to deforestation affects a large proportion of threatened species.

Of approximately 1,250 threatened plant species and 390 threatened terrestrial animal species, land clearing and associated habitat degradation are identified as threats for 964 plant species and 286 animal species. Species affected include Carnaby's cockatoo, the southern cassowary, Bennett's tree-kangaroo, the Cape York rock-wallaby, the black-flanked rock-wallaby, and the koala, which is classified as Vulnerable in Queensland and New South Wales.

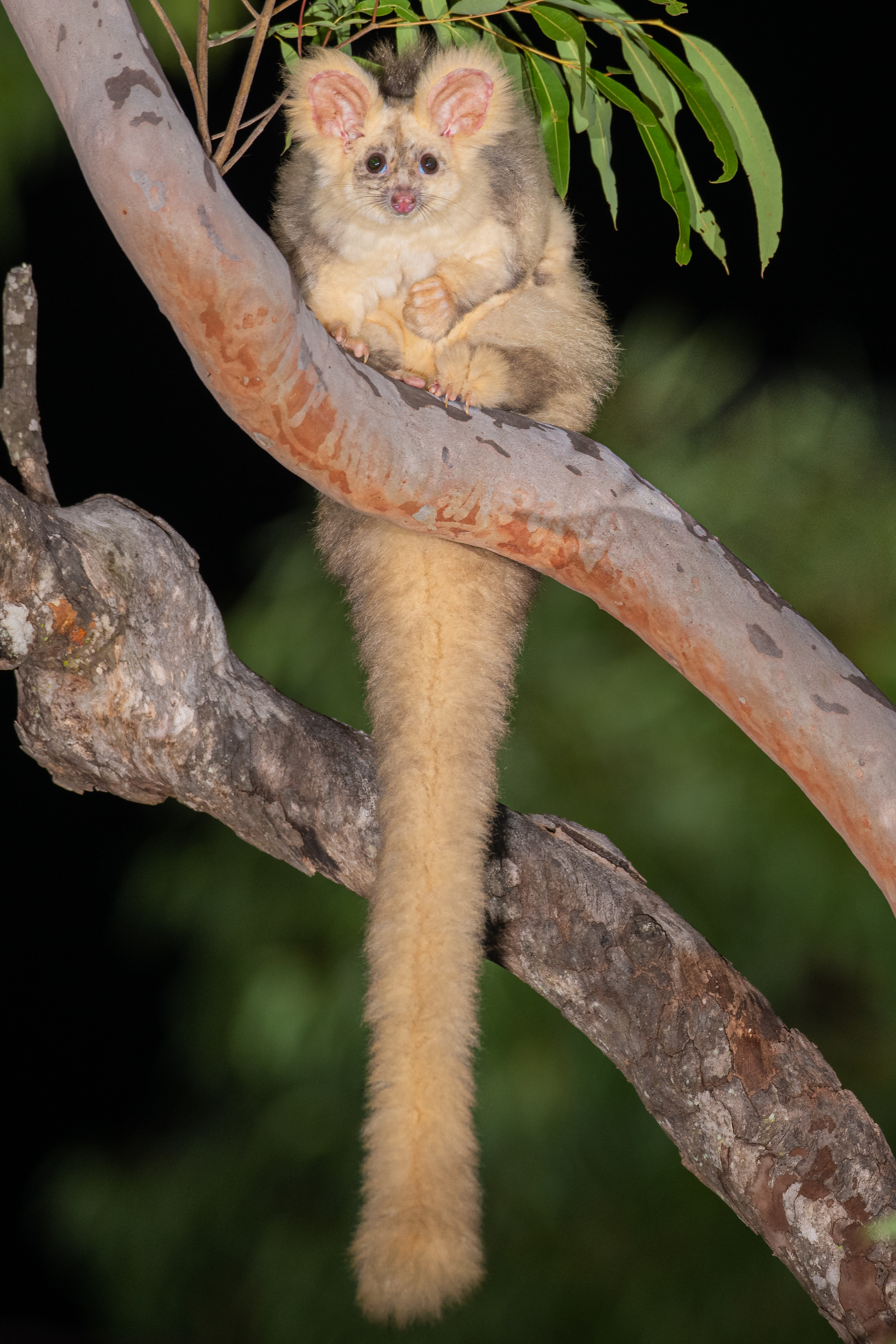
This image depicts a Greater Glider in a Eucalypt tree.

=== Climate change ===
Land clearing contributes to climate change by releasing carbon stored in vegetation and soils and by reducing the capacity of ecosystems to absorb carbon dioxide. When trees are removed or burned, stored carbon is released into the atmosphere, increasing greenhouse gas emissions.

Deforestation and forest degradation account for a significant share of global greenhouse gas emissions, and land clearing remains an important source of emissions within Australia's land-use sector. Vegetation loss can also influence local and regional climate conditions by reducing shade and moisture and increasing surface temperatures.

=== Deforestation and climate extremes ===
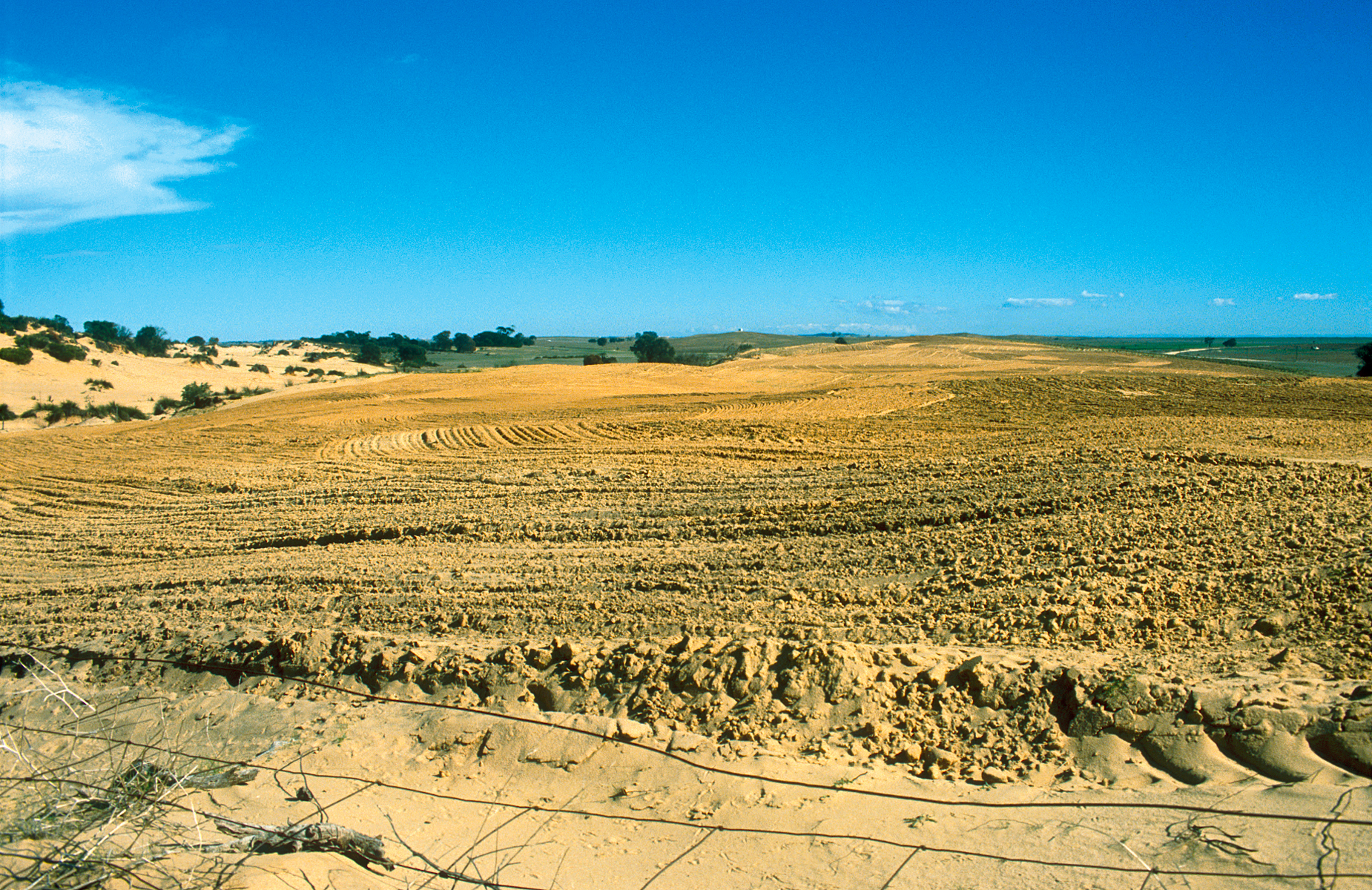
Cleared Mallee bushland in South Australia, 1992

An organisation checked the impacts on climate extremes and droughts by analysing daily rainfall and surface temperature output from the Mark 3 GCM.

This work, the first of its kind, demonstrated an increase in the number of dry days (<1mm rainfall) and hot days (maximum temperature >35 °C), a decrease in daily rainfall intensity and cumulative rainfall on rain days, and an increase in duration of droughts under modified land-cover conditions. These changes were statistically significant for all years across eastern Australia and especially pronounced during strong El Niño events.

These studies have demonstrated that LCC has exacerbated the mean climate anomaly and climate extremes in the southwest and eastern Australia, thus resulting in longer-lasting and more severe droughts.

== Regional trends ==
Clearing patterns differ across Australia, however Queensland has continued to drive the majority of national vegetation loss. In 2022-2023 the state cleared 332,015 hectares for pasture expansion. Roughly half of those hectares were within Great Barrier Reef catchments, an area where rainfall lands in rivers that flow to the reef. These catchments raise concern due to sediment runoff and erosion potentially impacting the reef's water quality.

The Brigalow Belt and Mulga lands make up the majority of Queensland's hotspot regions, where modeling shows high probabilities for future clearing, as well as significant overlap with threatened vegetation communities. In more inland, pastoral zones of New South Wales and South Australia, similar pressures occur, as clearing is often linked to grazing.

In Tasmania, industrial logging and land clearing continue in areas near protected forests, including parts of the Takayna/Tarkineregion. Photo documentation shows the removal of eucalypt forests, old-growth stands, and habitat for species such as the glossy black cockatoo.

Urban expansion is also contributing to localized clearing along the eastern seaboard of Australia, specifically in south-east Queensland and peri-urban regions of New South Wales, where the removal of koala feed trees has increased habitat decline.

== Indigenous land management and perspectives ==
Indigenous peoples in Australia have manage landscapes, using practices such as frequent, low-intensity cultural burning to maintain open grasslands, woodlands, and diverse plant communities. Research from northwest Tasmania suggests that many areas historically described as natural grasslands were shaped by long-term Aboriginal fire management. When these practices declined following British colonization, vegetation structure changed rapidly, with dense shrub and rainforest species growing into the previously open ecosystems. These findings suggest that the condition of some pre-colonial landscapes depended on continued Indigenous land stewardship.

Modern land clearing and mining have also been shown to occur on or near Indigenous lands, affecting clean water, bush foods, and soil stability that Aboriginal and Torres Strait Islander communities rely on. Reviews of mining impacts show that vegetation loss and habitat disturbance can undermine cultural practices linked to specific species and landscapes.

National reports on deforestation also note that large-scale clearing for agriculture, forestry, mining, and development can damage areas of cultural significance, including songlines, sacred sites, and Country cared for by First Nations peoples. In many cases, clearing occurs without the consent of Aboriginals, contributing to what some describe as degraded Country. The combined ecological and cultural effects have led to increased calls for land-clearing policy, conservation planning, and restoration programs to be developed in partnership with First Nations communities, recognizing Indigenous rights.

== Response ==
Land clearing laws have been a political football for decades. From the 1970s onwards unions and environmentalists have challenged the clearing of forests, beaches and other specific sites. Since the 1980s, the rate of land clearing has declined due to changing attitudes and greater awareness of the damaging effects of the clearing. The Queensland and New South Wales governments implemented bans on land clearing during the 1990s and early 2000s. Australia remains a deforestation front, the only developed nation to do so.

Both Queensland and New South Wales monitor land clearing on an annual basis using satellite imagery under the Statewide Landcover and Trees Study.

=== Regulation of clearing ===
Clearing is now controlled by legislation in Western Australia, South Australia, Victoria, New South Wales, and to a lesser degree in Queensland. Land clearing controls differ substantially between jurisdictions, and despite growing awareness of the effect of land degradation, controls on clearing have been generally opposed by farmers.

==== Federal legislation ====
Land clearing is controlled indirectly by federal law in the form of the Environment Protection and Biodiversity Conservation Act 1999 (Cth), which may also apply if there are federally protected threatened species (plant or animal) or endangered ecological communities present on the land in question.

==== Fire controls ====
Depending on the proximity to high risk bush fire zones in each state, the 10/30 rule or the 10/50 rule might apply. This allows the clearing of trees within 10 meters of homes or clearing undergrowth within 30 or 50 meters of home. This reduces fuel for fire near homes which has proven effective since implementation.

==== New South Wales ====
Clearing of native vegetation in NSW is regulated by the Local Land Services Act 2013 (NSW) and by the protections on the habitat of threatened species contained in the Biodiversity Conservation Act 2016 (NSW). It is also regulated by development control and Environmental Planning Instruments (EPIs) under land use planning law, namely the Environmental Planning and Assessment Act 1979 (NSW). Federal law in the form of the Environment Protection and Biodiversity Conservation Act 1999 (Cth) may also apply if there are federally protected threatened species (plant or animal) or endangered ecological communities present on the land in question. Exempt species are outlined in the Biosecurity Act 2015 and can be cleared by property owners at any time.

The Berejiklian government eased vegetation protection laws in 2017. According to the state government the state lost 54,000 hectares of woody vegetation in 2019.

==== Queensland ====
Clearing of native vegetation in Queensland is principally regulated by the Vegetation Management Act 1999. The Federal EPBC Act may also apply (see above)

Clearing rates in Queensland declined from peaks in the 1990s, after a successful campaign from conservation groups and communities throughout Queensland. In 2018, the state government passed legislation that banned broadscale clearing of remnant vegetation. The reforms aimed to protect high value regrowth.

==== South Australia ====
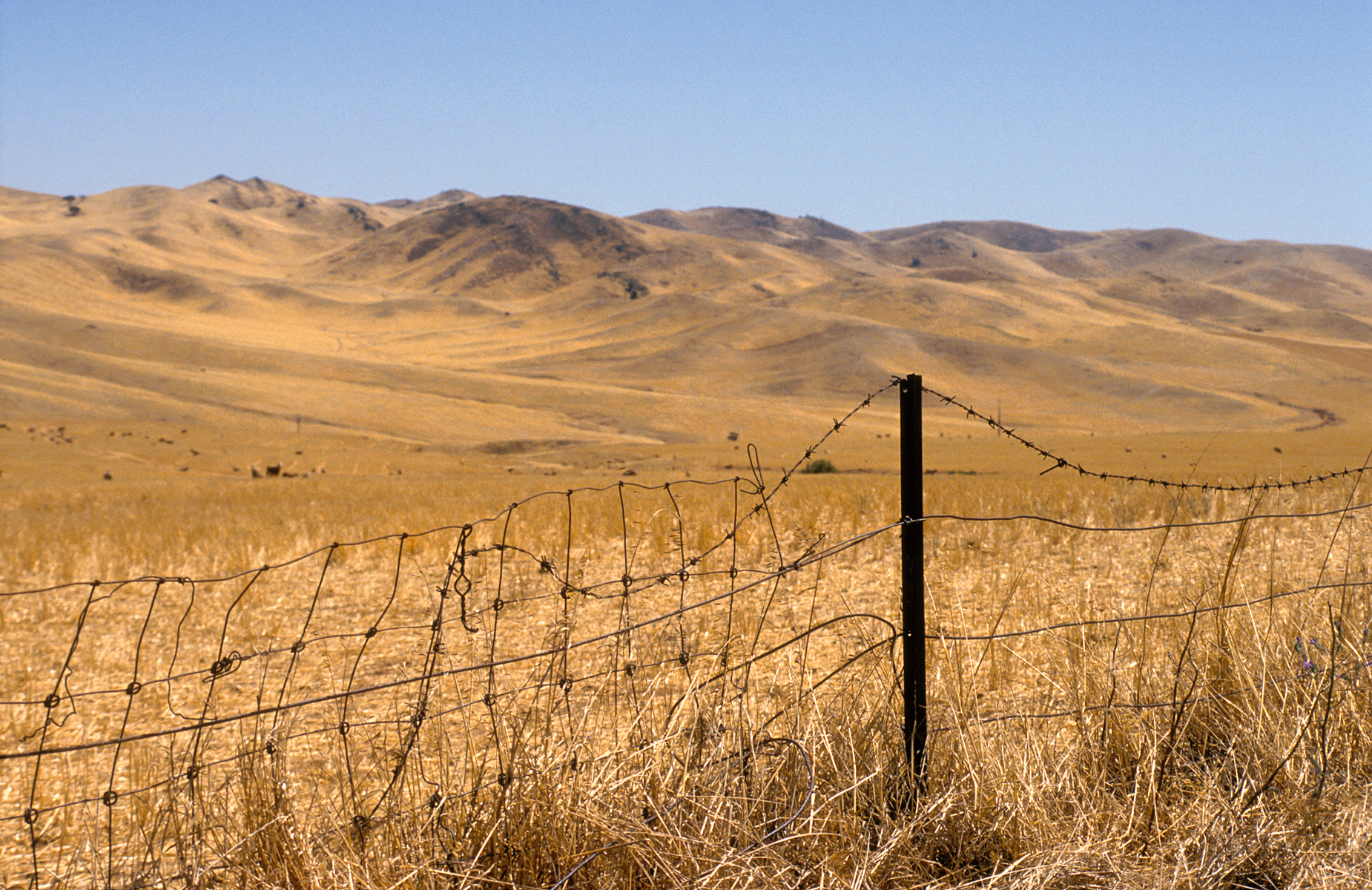
Land cleared for mining in South Australia, 1992

Clearing of native vegetation in SA is principally regulated by the Native Vegetation Act 1991 (SA). The Federal EPBC Act may also apply (see above).

==== Western Australia ====
In Western Australia, the regulation of native vegetation land clearing is under the Environmental Protection Act 1986 (EP ACT).

==== Local councils ====
In urban areas or cities, tree removal is governed by local council laws outlined in what's called a Tree Preservation Order (TPO). This set of laws is more specific to reflect the localized objectives for urban forest retention by the council. Common objectives include creating healthier ecosystems, improving biodiversity and mitigating the heat island effect through tree retention and scheduled tree planting programs. TPO's will typically include a significant tree register which lists individual or groups of protected trees and their locations which cannot be removed under any circumstances. TPO's also come with exemptions which allow property owners to remove trees without prior approval. Exemptions may include the maximum height and spread of trees that need council consent for removal and a list of exempt species that can be removed irrespective of height and spread.

== Restoration efforts and future outlook ==
Current restoration efforts in Australia focus on re-establishing native vegetation, improving land conditions, and reducing the environmental impacts associated with past clearing. Conservation organizations have reported that areas affected by extensive clearing often require more long-term rehabilitation, such as erosion control, replanting programs, and measures to stabilize soil and waterways. Riparian environments, land along riversides, are a noted priority for ongoing restoration projects, as vegetation loss has contributed to declining water quality and increased sedimentation in major river systems.

Current assessments have identified eastern Australia as a global deforestation hotspot, with conservation organizations arguing that there should be stronger protections to limit clearing and support ecosystem recovery. Proposed strategies include expanding native vegetation safeguards, improving monitoring frameworks, encouraging landholders to retain or restore habitats on their land, and for policymakers to increase laws surrounding land clearing. Conservation organizations present these approaches as necessary to maintain remaining forest cover and reduce the pressures behind biodiversity decline.

Future restoration outcomes are closely linked to policy and economic conditions. Current research indicates that fluctuations in commodity prices influence land-clearing rates, sometimes reducing the effectiveness of regulatory measures. Studies suggest that long-term recovery will require policy frameworks that address the economic drivers of clearing, including incentives for sustainable land use and support for conservation-first land management.Analyses from environmental groups and researchers argue that restoration efforts must operate alongside strengthened clearing controls and policies designed to reduce pressures on native vegetation.

The outlook for recovery depends on continued investment in rehabilitation programs, improved monitoring, and coordinated approaches between governments, landholders, and conservation organizations.

== See also ==
- Deforestation in Victoria
- Campaign to Save Native Forests
- Clearcutting
- Conservation in Australia
- Illegal logging in Australia
- Logging in the Toolangi State Forest
- Logging in the Wielangta Forest
- Woodchipping in Australia
- Mining in Australia

== Notes ==
- Australian Conservation Foundation 2007, Viewed 26 October 2007.
- Australian Greenhouse Office 2000, Land Clearing: A Social History, Commonwealth of Australia, Canberra. Accessed on 29 October 2007.
- Benson, J.S 1991, The effect of 200 years of European settlement on the vegetation and flora of New South Wales, Cunninghamia, 2:343-370.
- Cogger, H, Ford, H, Johnson, C, Holman, J and Butler, D 2003, Impacts of Land Clearing on Australian Wildlife in Queensland, World Wildlife Foundation Australia, Sydney
- Commonwealth Scientific and Industrial Research Organisation (CSIRO) 2007, Land and Water, https://www.clw.csiro.au/issues/salinity/faq.html viewed 29 October 2007.
- Department of Environment and Water Resources, State of the Environment Report, viewed 26 October 2007.
- Department of the Environment and Heritage 2005, National Vegetation Information System (NVIS) Stage 1, Version 3.0 Major Vegetation Groups,
- Diamond, Jared, Collapse: How Societies Choose to Fail or Succeed, Penguin Books, 2005 and 2011 (ISBN 9780241958681). See chapter 13 entitled « "Mining" Australia » (pages 378–416).
- Giles, D 2007, State's land clearing concern, in The Courier-Mail, 28 October 2007.
- National Land and Water Resources Audit, Present Vegetation 1998 in National Land and Water Resources Audit 2001, Commonwealth of Australia, viewed 29 October 2007.
- Thackway, R & Cresswell, I.D (eds.) 1995, An Interim Biogeographic Regionalization for Australia: A Framework for Setting Priorities in the National Reserves System Cooperative Program, Australian Nature Conservation Agency, Canberra.
- The Australian Bureau of Statistics, www.abs.gov.au, viewed 26 October 2007.
