= NSW Wildlife Information Rescue and Education Service =

Australian animal welfare organisation

WIRES Wildlife Information Rescue and Education Service Ltd WIRES Wildlife Information Rescue and Education Service Ltd
- Founded: 1985; 41 years ago
- Location: Brookvale, Sydney NSW
- Region served: New South Wales
- Employees: 50+
- Volunteers: 3500+ (as of 2020)
- Website: www.wires.org.au

WIRES Wildlife Rescue (WIRES Wildlife Information Rescue and Education Service Ltd) is the largest wildlife rescue & rehabilitation charity in Australia. It is a non-profit organisation providing rescue and rehabilitation for all native Australian fauna. All animal rescuers and carers are volunteers. It is funded by public donations and operates throughout Australia.

== Aims ==
WIRES mission is to actively rescue, rehabilitate and preserve Australian wildlife and inspire others to do the same.

The main activities of WIRES is to respond to individual public reports of sick, injured or orphaned native wildlife. If necessary, trained WIRES volunteers will rescue (collect) the animal, foster it (provide treatment and care until it is healthy), and release it back into the wild. WIRES operates under an authority from a government agency, the National Parks and Wildlife Service, allowing it to rescue and rehabilitate native animals, a practice which is generally forbidden by law in Australia. WIRES offers a short rescue and immediate care course that equips people to work with common species.

Volunteers of WIRES can choose their level of commitment to the organization. Some of them also take extra training to handle specific species, such as; Koalas, snakes, possums, or gliders. The organization has 29 branches across NSW, being the biggest wildlife volunteer group in the country.

== History and background ==
The concept of WIRES was established in the 1980's, when an injured Australian white ibis was found in Hyde Park, Sydney. No organisation, government or conservation group could be found to take responsibility for its care. Other animal welfare groups, such as the RSPCA, were not experienced with the needs of native animals, while the only suitable government agency, the National Parks and Wildlife Service, did not have the funding and staff levels needed to cope with injured fauna.

A small group of private citizens formed to take on this responsibility and, by learning from one another, built up the knowledge and experience to meet the unique needs of Australian wildlife. The network grew quickly and in 1986 WIRES was officially launched in Sydney. In 1987 it was incorporated as a non-profit organisation.

As at 2020, WIRES has a network of some 3000 volunteer members in 28 branches across NSW. WIRES received around 100,000 phone calls from the public in 2010, and was called to assist over 95,000 mammals, birds, reptiles and amphibians. WIRES works closely with veterinarians, zoos, the NPWS and other animal welfare organisations.

In December 2019, WIRES announced that the organization experienced emergency conditions as never before. At the end of 2019, volunteers of WIRES attended more than 3,300 rescues for wild animals. Meanwhile, its rescue line received more than 20,000 calls.

During the 2019-2020 bushfire crisis in Australia, WIRES had received around $60 million until February in donations from individuals and companies concerned about wild animals. In August, the total amount reached $90 million. WIRES decided to redistribute the money to other licensed animal rescue organisations across Australia. The animal welfare organization also provided grants for animal carers.

Full details on how the emergency funding is being distributed "Emergency Response and Recovery Plan".. WIRES continues to be transparent about the funding and update this page regularly.

WIRES took part in both a Royal Commission and an extensive review conducted by the Australian Government's Charities and Not for Profits Commission during 2020. The review was made public in October 2020, finding the charities (including WIRES) acted legally and responsibly, allocating funds to bushfire response programs and their delivery, and protecting donations from fraud. And were found to have "balanced immediate relief with the need to supply funds for the long-term recovery phase".

In February 2020, some volunteers complained about WIRES due to loathing to spend. They said that the organizations spent just $7 million of the money received and they were keeping for themselves the other $53 million. WIRES refuted the claims. WIRES' CEO Leanne Taylor assured that the organization was doing the possible to redistribute the donations effectively. WIRES' spokesman John Grant mentioned that the organization was not prepared for receiving a huge amount of cash.

The organization said that seven million dollars were given to volunteers for caring affected animals. The other $25 million would go to rehabilitation and relief, which includes cooperation with other animal welfare groups in Australia. The latter $25 million would go to actions for reducing and prevent devastating fires.

== Organisational structure ==
All animal rescue and rehabilitation is carried out by WIRES' volunteer members in their own homes. Branches perform fundraising to subsidise the costs of animal feed, veterinary supplies, cages, and other expenses incurred by their members.

The WIRES Head Office and the NSW call centre, referred to as the WIRES Rescue Office, are located in Brookvale, Sydney. There are staff members looking after rescue calls, volunteers, training, communications, finance, IT and fundraising. WIRES Rescue Office operates 365 days a year, managing hundreds of calls a day from the community, working actively with WIRES volunteers and community vets to provide rescue advice and assistance for tens of thousands of native animals every year.

WIRES also has a fleet of wildlife ambulances covering greater Sydney, Tasmania and South Eastern Queensland which provides assistance with rescues during the day when volunteer rescuers are at work and less available to attend rescues. The ambulances are also part of WIRES investment in Emergency Response provision.

WIRES is an incorporated association. WIRES State council (WSC) is composed of elected volunteer representatives from WIRES 28 branches and WIRES Board is elected annually by the council from council members. WIRES Board has the responsibility for setting the policy and strategic direction of the organisation in conjunction with WIRES chief executive officer (CEO). WIRES is a registered charity and a separate group of five Directors oversees public donations through the WIRES Public Gift fund.

WIRES has the ACNC, the Australian Charities and Not-for-profits Commission tick of approval and DGR, deductible gift recipient status.

WIRES receives no confirmed, ongoing government funding for rescue and care operations.

== See also ==
- Conservation in Australia
- Animal welfare and rights in Australia
