= National Parks and Wildlife Service =

National Parks and Wildlife Service may refer to:

- National Parks and Wildlife Service (Ireland)
- National Parks and Wildlife Service South Australia
- National Parks and Wildlife Service (Commonwealth), which was renamed to Australian Nature Conservation Agency in the early 1990s
- NSW National Parks & Wildlife Service
- Queensland Parks and Wildlife Service
- Tasmania Parks and Wildlife Service
