= Sydney Metropolitan Wildlife Services =

Sydney Metropolitan Wildlife Services, Inc (SMWS) is an organisation that is dedicated to caring for Sydney's sick, injured or orphaned native fauna. Members are licensed by the National Parks and Wildlife Service under the National Parks and Wildlife Act, 1974. The head office of SMWS is in the Lane Cove National Park and offers 24-hour rescue service.

== Duties ==
- Wildlife Conservation
- Wildlife Rescue and Rehabilitation
- Wildlife Training
- Public education about wildlife matters.
- Assistance to the New South Wales Rural Fire Service
