= Edith Ogilby Berg =

First American woman to fly as an airplane passenger

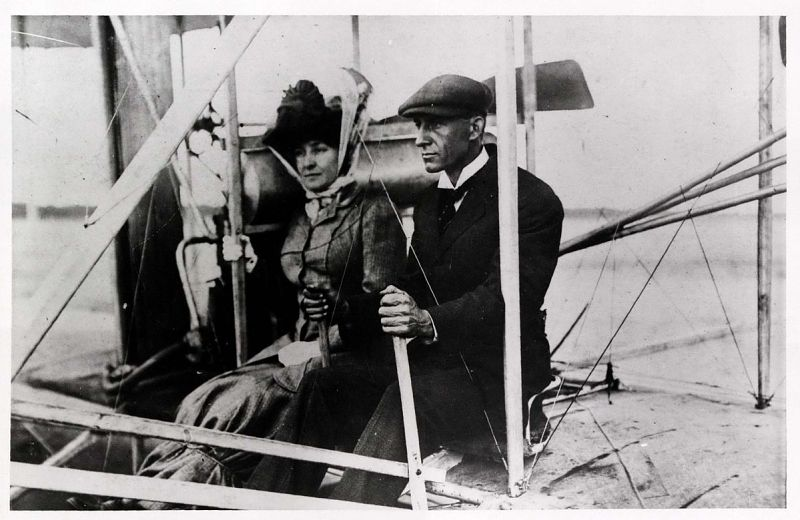
Edith O. Berg, the first American woman to fly as a passenger in an airplane, pictured beside Wilbur Wright shortly before their takeoff at Auvers, France.

Edith Ogilby Berg (c.1868–1949) was the first American woman passenger on a controlled airplane flight, flown by Wilbur Wright in September 1908 and is considered a key influence in the hobble skirt as a fashion trend. For some years she was married to Hart O. Berg, who represented the Wright Brothers' business interests in Europe.

== Early life ==
Edith Ogilby was born in California. She was a daughter of actress Louise Paullin and Robert Edwin Ogilby, who had immigrated from Britain or Ireland to California in the Gold Rush of 1849, then became a professor of drawing at the University of California-Berkeley. Her grandfather was Irish-born British military officer Sir David Ogilby.

Edith married Charles Bryant Titcomb in 1887 at age 19. They had a daughter, Grace Titcomb. The couple divorced in 1889.

She became an actress under the stage name Edith Paullin, adopting her mother's maiden name. She appeared in some of the same productions as her second husband, the actor and producer Hubert Druce. While married to Hubert, Edith went by Edith Alice Druce until they divorced in January 1905.

== Life with Berg and aviation connections ==
Edith married Hart O. Berg in 1906 and thus met the Wright brothers. Wilbur Wright described her as “a jolly woman and very intelligent”, and his sister Katharine said Edith was "about the best dressed woman I ever saw”.

She saw Wilbur demonstrate the Wright Flyer airplane at Le Mans, France, and asked Wilbur for a ride in it. He agreed, and on 7 October 1908 Berg rode as his passenger in a two-minute flight at nearby Auvours, France, thus becoming the first American woman to fly in a fixed-wing aircraft.

On the aircraft, she tied a rope around her skirt at her ankles to keep it from blowing in the wind during the flight. A French fashion designer watching the flight noticed her walk away from the aircraft with her skirt still tied. This image is said to have influenced the subsequent hobble skirt fashion of the early 20th century.

Edith had another family connection to aviation. In 1905, her daughter Grace had married Paris lawyer Paul Foy. Foy conducted the first prosecution for “furious driving in the air” in October 1909, following the crash during an air show at Port-Aviation (often called "Juvisy Airfield") in Viry-Châtillon of a Blériot monoplane flown by Alfred Leblanc into a crowd of spectators, injuring more than a dozen people and killing a woman who became the first person in history to be struck by a falling airplane.

== Later life ==
Edith and Hart Berg divorced in 1922. She then used the name Edith Ogilby-Druce. She died in August 1949 in San Francisco.

== Archives and photos ==
- Photo of Edith Ogilby Berg with Wilbur Wright, in National Air and Space Museum archives
- Another photo with Wilbur Wright at Hargrave: the Pioneers: Aviation and Aeromodelling.
- Photo of Mr. and Mrs. Hart O. Berg at Camp d'Auvours, Wright State University Libraries Archives
