= Hart O. Berg =

American-born engineer and businessman

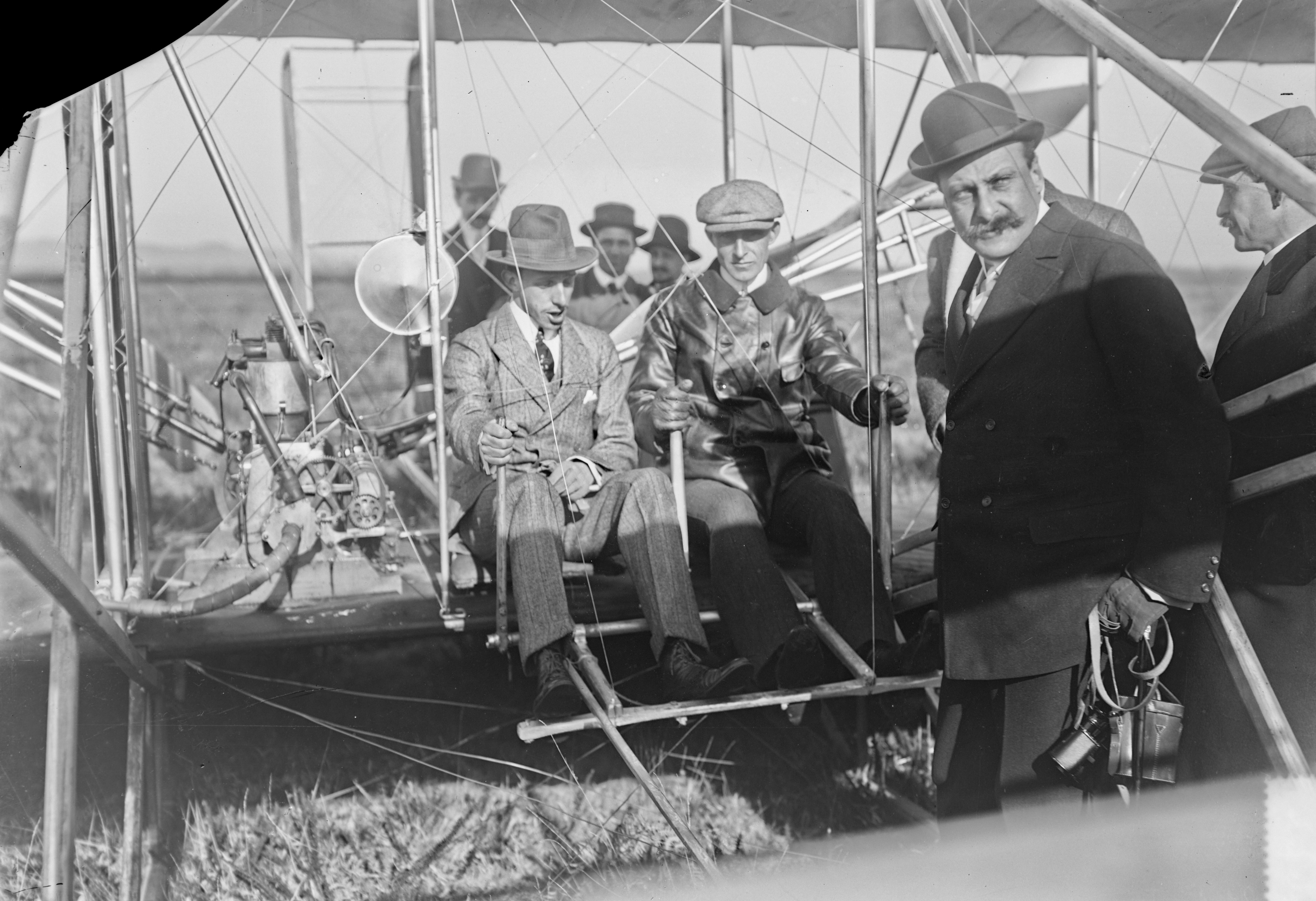
- Hart O. Berg (in the foreground), with Wilbur Wright and King Alfonso XIII in Pau, France, on 20 February 1909. Orville Wright in cap watches on the right.
- Born: Hart Ostheimer Berg; March 23, 1865; Philadelphia, Pennsylvania, U.S.
- Died: December 9, 1941 (aged 76); New York, U.S.
- Employers: Colt’s Patent Fire Arms Manufacturing Company (1896-1896); Fabrique Nationale d'Armes de Guerre (1896); Pope Manufacturing Company (1897-1902)
- Title: Knights of the French Legion of Honour
- Spouses: Edith Ogilby Berg (m. 1906; div. 1922) Lena Davis Willits McKinney (m. 1925; died 1931)
- Children: Grace Titcomb (step-daughter)
- Parent(s): Joseph and Louisa Berg

Hart Ostheimer Berg (1865–1941) was an American-born engineer and businessman. Celebrated for his transatlantic promotion of innovative industrial products in the early twentieth century, he is best known for having represented the Wright Brothers’ aviation interests in Europe.

== Birth, family and early life ==
Berg was born in Franklin Street above Girard Avenue, Philadelphia, on 23 March 1865 to Joseph and Louisa Berg, native-born Pennsylvanians of German Jewish descent. His father was a garment manufacturer and his mother was a sister of Alfred, William and George Ostheimer, principals of an extensive import-export business with offices in Paris, Vienna, Berlin and London. His cousins included Dr Maurice Ostheimer who, with his wife Martha McIlvain, owned the Martha and Maurice Ostheimer Estate.

After attendance at private schools, Berg was sent to Europe in his teens to complete his education and qualified as an engineer at Liège in Belgium. In the late 1880s he several times sailed between France and the United States, declaring he was of “no occupation”, but by 1891 he described himself as “merchant”, was based in New York, and visited Egypt and India.

== Weapons manufacture ==
Around 1893 he settled at Hartford, Connecticut, where he obtained a managerial appointment with Colt’s Patent Fire Arms Manufacturing Company. (Note: The United States Commissioner-General’s report on the Paris Exposition of 1900 described Berg as “formerly employed by the Colt Patent Fire Arms Company and the Union Metallic Cartridge Company”. It is not evident if these employments were successive or concurrent.) His arrival at Colt coincided with the company bringing into production its M1889 revolver and developing the M1895 machine-gun under licence from John M. Browning. Berg is said to have been associated with both projects, and Browning later remembered they quickly got well acquainted.

Retaining influential contacts in Belgium from his earlier residence in Belgium (Note: In 1894/5 he took the future King Albert I on an automobile excursion in America, as recalled by Berg in a letter to George Bia, his agent in Brussels: Library of Congress - Wilbur and Orville Wright Papers, 1809-1979 (Wright Papers) - Subject File: Foreign Business - Agents and Representatives - Flint & Company, 25 November 1908.) allowed him to renew his links with Liège by 1896, joining the Belgian manufacturer Fabrique Nationale d'Armes de Guerre (FN) in a senior capacity. Despite state-of-the-art manufacturing capabilities by the end of 1895 FN was in poor financial shape due to lack of orders on their M1889 rifles and a lost legal battle with Mauser over the rights to produce improved M1893s. In 1896, most of their primary shareholders left and a major competitor DWM took over a controlling stake, excluding the company from the export market for military firearms.

This forced it to diversify into commercial firearms, their parts but also bicycles, so in April 1897 Berg returned to Hartford to investigate advances in bicycle design introduced by the Pope Manufacturing Company. In the course of his visit he negotiated manufacturing rights for FN in respect of the new “chainless bicycle” (which went into serial production in 1898 and was made until 1920s) and also met John Browning. Browning filed four handgun patent application in 1895-1896, of which two later became Colt M1900 and le pistolet Browning. He licensed pistols of his design for production and sale by Colt within US and Canada in July 1896, but it's believed at the time Colt was mainly protecting its revolver market.

Browning had intended to produce the smallest gun for the European market himself, but Berg persuaded him that FN was a prime candidate to undertake its manufacture, returned to Liège with a license proposal, presented it to FN board in June 1897, and in July 1897 an agreement was concluded granting FN the European rights for what became the M1899. In the following year Berg was unsuccessful in attempting to persuade Browning to supervise the pistol’s production in Belgium, but its manufacture by FN transformed the fortunes of that company and laid the foundation for its long-term relationship with Browning (who died on FN’s premises in 1924).

== Automobile business ==
In 1897 Berg was engaged by Pope Manufacturing Company to sell the foreign manufacturing rights for its Columbia cars. The engagement resulted in licences being granted to French, German and Belgian fabricators, and Berg himself became Director-General for Europe of Pope’s associate, Electric Vehicle Company, briefly America’s largest maker of automobiles.

In France he set up Société l’Électromotion to build and service two-seater motor carriages and phaetons mounted on Columbia running gear. (Note: By 1901 Berg had established a central electric charging station, capable of servicing 50 or 60 vehicles, in Paris’s Avenue Montaigne and was in the process of creating another for 150 vehicles near the Arc de Triomphe: The Motor Car Journal, London, 16 March 1901. He published articles on "American Automobiles Abroad" in The Automobile Review, March 1901, p. 50, and "The Electric Automobile in Paris" in Electrical World and Engineer, Vol. XXXVII (1901), p. 102.) These were assembled at Levallois-Perret, where he also supervised the construction for Clement-Bayard of the first major automobile factory to be built near Paris. He was at that time described as Clement-Bayard’s “chief engineer”, but this was only one of the several capacities in which he operated. In July 1899, in a test of vehicle endurance, he took the wheel of a Columbia electric two-seater while Gustave Philippart (creator of the modern diabolo) drove a Columbia electric phaeton over a distance of 76 km at Longchamp.

During 1902 he alternated between France and America, establishing Berg Automobile Company at Cleveland, Ohio, to produce a European-styled car (copied from a contemporary Panhard model) for the American market. Called the Berg, this was initially powered by a 2-cylinder engine but was upgraded to become a 4-cylinder 24 brake horsepower tourer - one of the first such automobiles built in America. It was assembled at the Cleveland Machine Screw Factory (“separated by a passage” from the Electric Vehicle Company’s premises) with parts sourced from other manufacturers, and was first shown at the New York Auto Show in 1903. The company designed another model, the Euclid, but this was never put into production and in 1904 Berg sold the business to Worthington Automobile Company of New York.

== Paris Exposition ==
Although he operated independently from his Ostheimer relatives, both he and his uncle George Ostheimer (the first Secretary of the American Chamber of Commerce in Paris) were among ninety-five American-nominated members of the international awards jury at the Paris Exposition of 1900, Berg being a juror in the machine tool class. (Note: The Ostheimer connection was useful in the course of Berg’s work with the Wright Brothers. His uncle George Ostheimer controlled Compagnie Franco-Americaine des Jantes en Bois which supplied wooden wheel rims for Wright’s aircraft in March 1909: Wright Papers - General Correspondence: Hart O. Berg to Wright Brothers, 7 March 1909.) For their services in this connection both men were made Knights of the French Legion of Honour. A United States Government Report referred to Berg’s “hearty cooperation” with the U.S. Department of Machinery and Electricity in achieving the Department’s aims at the Exposition.

== Association with Charles R. Flint ==
From 1904 onwards Berg was associated in commerce with Charles R. Flint. Their business initially consisted of munitions supply to Russia during the Russo-Japan War, and in 1904-6 Berg’s office base alternated between St Petersburg and Berlin.

Both Russians and Japanese were interested in the Osetr-class submarine which had been designed by Simon Lake but which the United States Navy had declined to buy. Charles Flint called Lake to a breakfast meeting during which he claimed Berg could negotiate a sale in Russia later the same day. Berg duly performed, and within hours Lake received a cable ordering one submarine for trials and a further five if the trials proved successful. Over the next three years Berg was involved in supervising the building within Russia of these six submarines and of a further four which were the first to mount large calibre guns for surface fighting. He was also instrumental in the sale and construction, at Pola, of two Lake submarines for Austria-Hungary.

Details of the financial relationship between Flint and Berg are elusive. In 1908 hearings before a House of Representatives Select Committee, Flint stated “Mr Berg is my associate and agent” and “when he acts for Mr Lake he is also an associate of mine”. Lake’s evidence to the same committee was scarcely more revealing: “Our relations are not with Mr Flint directly. Our direct relations are with Mr Berg, and Mr Flint is identified with him in some way. One does business on one side of the ocean and one on the other”.

It was while Berg was working in Russia that Flint became aware of the Wright Brothers’ progress in the field of powered flight and initiated discussions to obtain an exclusive agency to sell their “flyer” outside America. He reported details of the Wrights’ progress to Berg for his commercial evaluation. Simon Lake, who was at that time based in Berg’s office, commented favourably on the report but came to regret one of the consequences of what followed, recalling “Flint and the Wright Brothers cost me the best agent a man ever had, for Berg grew so interested in the flying-machine that he almost forgot my contraptions”.

== Representation of the Wright Brothers ==
Berg was initially lukewarm in his assessment of the Wrights’ invention. In May 1907 Wilbur Wright travelled to Europe to persuade him of its reality and importance. (Note: In 1907 Berg, who maintained a London office in Regent Street, had counselled Flint’s friend Lady Jane Taylor on how best to convince Richard Haldane (War Minister) and Lord Tweedmouth (First Lord of the Admiralty) that the Wrights should be commissioned to build aircraft for the British armed forces; her endeavours in this respect failed and the Wrights later withdrew Flint & Company’s authority to represent them in Britain: A. M. Gollin, No Longer An Island: Britain and the Wright Brothers, 1902-1909, Stanford University Press, California, 1984, pp. 214-221.) Quickly convinced of Wright’s engineering brilliance and the reliability of his narrative, Berg introduced him to Henri Deutsch de la Meurthe and other influential figures in Paris. Wilbur reciprocated Berg’s esteem, describing him to his brother Orville as “a pretty slick hand... very practical... about as enthusiastic as a man could be and he really has a remarkable facility for reaching people”.

In November Charles Flint & Company and Hart Berg were jointly appointed sole agents outside America to negotiate contracts for the sale, manufacture or use of the Wrights’ “flyer” and to establish companies to take over ownership and exploitation of the brothers’ inventions. Sales negotiations were held with both the French and German governments but, as Berg had anticipated at the outset, it was with private investors that contracts were eventually signed.

In March 1908 a syndicate, assembled largely by Berg and led by Lazare Weiller and Deutsch de la Meurthe, acquired the French rights to the brothers’ airplane through the medium of a newly formed company, Compagnie Générale Nationale de Navigation Aérienne. In return the Wrights were to receive a cash sum and shares in the company while Flint & Company and Berg were to apply the commission entitlement under their agency arrangement to subscribe for shares. These arrangements were subject to the current model of the Wrights’ plane successfully completing performance trials.

Berg played a key role in preparation for the trials, procuring components and equipment required by the Wrights, monitoring Bariquand et Marre’s production of the plane’s engine, and surveying with Wilbur possible trial locations. Berg’s old friend Léon Bollée allowed Wilbur free factory space for engineering work and showed them possible trial grounds near Le Mans. From these Berg selected the horse racecourse at Hunaudières, for which he paid a monthly rent plus fifteen per cent of ticket sales for admission to watch the flights. The Wrights had previously preferred to keep their machines away from public gaze but, under Berg’s influence, now began to derive substantial income from gate money.

On arrival at Le Mans, parts for Wrights’ Model A, in storage since shipment to France in the previous year, were found to have been damaged in transit due to poor packing. Between late June and early August Wilbur was engaged in repair and assembly, Berg assisting in the work for several days during July. (Note: There are other indications that Berg assisted in the assembly, and he played a part in servicing the plane, taking particular responsibility for the engine’s high tension ignition: James Tobin, To Conquer the Air: The Wright Brothers and the Great Race for Flight, Free Press, New York, 2004, p. 306.)

As Bollée's pregnant wife served as translator, Wilbur waited until Bollée's daughter was born, on 8 August, becoming godfather of Elisabeth. From that day onward Wright made frequent flights in preparation for the trials. The capabilities of his machine overawed observers and dispelled European scepticism about the brothers’ achievement. Wilbur became an overnight celebrity and, as thousands flocked to watch his manoeuvres, Berg proved “indispensable in the dual role of press agent and bodyguard”.

It was reported that, in the wild enthusiasm that greeted Wilbur’s first triumphant display, Berg was “so carried away that he kissed Mr Wright on both cheeks before he could get out of the saddle”, but the truth of the report has been disputed. That Berg correctly anticipated the impact and commercial opportunity of the flight was evident when he informed photographers it would only proceed after they folded and agreed not to use their cameras, exclusivity of photographic rights having been negotiated with an American publication. (Note: Arrangements had also been made with Charles Urban to film the proceedings at Le Mans, and a 490-feet motion picture (including a portrait group of Wright, Berg and others) was subsequently released: advertisement in The Music Hall and Theatre Review, No. 1,025, Vol. XL, October 1908, p. 240.)

Berg’s role in the conduct of affairs at Le Mans was perceived as so comprehensive that he was described as “Mr Wright’s guide, philosopher, friend and financier”. In September it fell to him to break to Wilbur news of the crash of another Wright Model A at Fort Myer, Virginia, when Orville’s passenger was killed and Orville himself sustained serious injuries from which he never fully recovered.

At the time, nearly 80 year old father Milton Wright had arrived, and got access tickets signed by Berg to the venues, the Hippodrome of Hunaudieres, and the Military area of Champ the Tir d'Auvours.

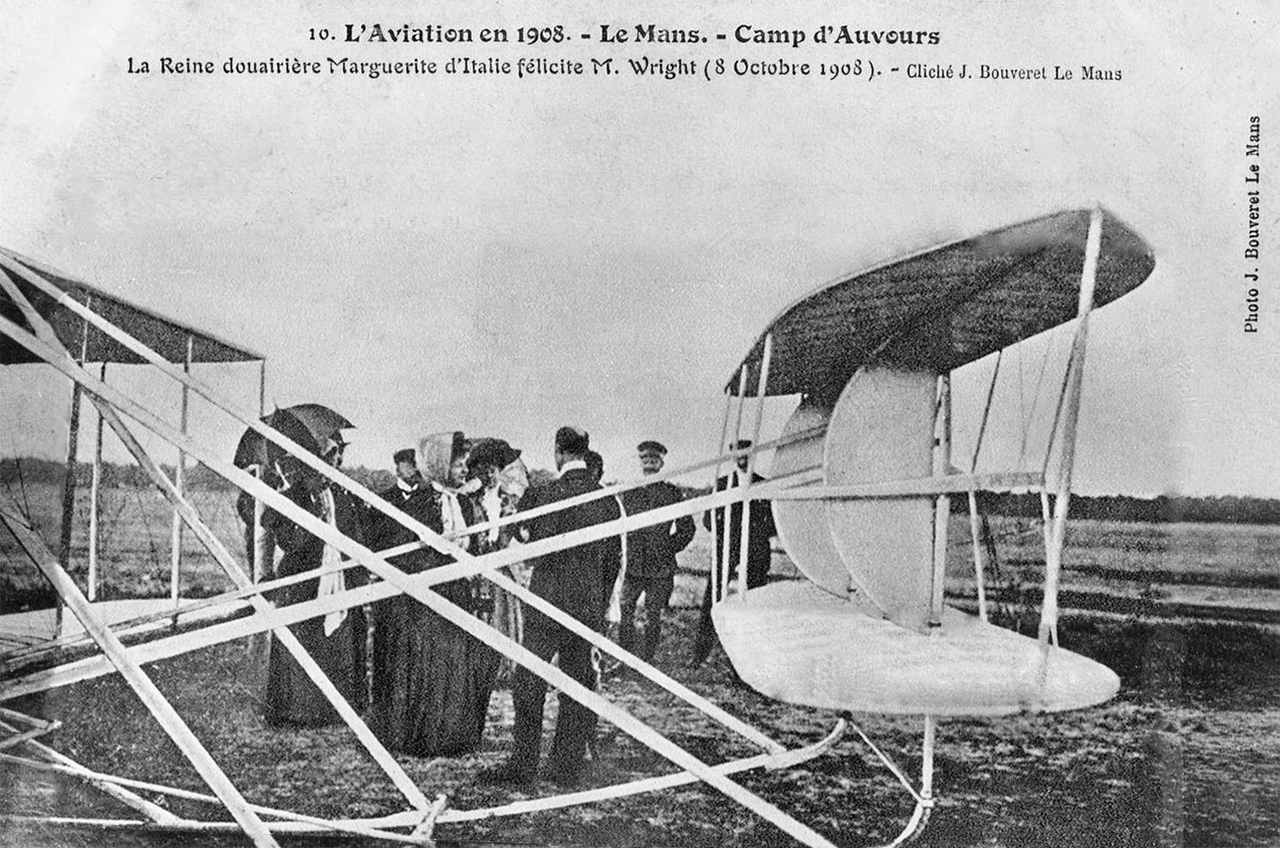
Wilbur and Queen Margherita of Savoy

On 7 October, Berg was for the first time carried as Wilbur’s passenger, in a flight of 3 minutes 24 seconds, and immediately afterwards Berg’s wife also flew with Wilbur for 2 minutes 3 seconds, this being described as “the first real flight made anywhere in the world by a woman”. (Note: Kelly justified this accolade on the grounds that, although “one or two women were reported to have flown in planes that made short hops”, Edith Berg was “the first to participate in a real flight”. Thérèse Peltier had been a passenger in a 200-metre straight-line flight four months earlier and is believed to have made a solo flight at head-height in the September. Henry Farman is said to have been accompanied by a lady passenger in May or June 1908, but there is no clear contemporary account of this. Mrs Berg was certainly the first American female to fly in a fixed-wing aircraft, and two days later was said to be “still so enthusiastic that she is begging Wilbur to take her up for at least an hour”: Wright Papers - Subject File: Foreign Business - Agents - Flint & Co. - Hart O. Berg to Rev. Milton Wright, 9 October 1908.) Three days later the ascent took place that finally satisfied the requirements of the Wright Brothers’ contract with the Weiller syndicate, and by the end of the month Berg could report “our whole endeavours are now centred in trying to get an order from the French Government. We are pulling every string so to do”.

In January 1909 Berg laid out a new flying field at Pau, to which Wilbur relocated for the advantage of its warmer climate. In travelling to Pau, Orville Wright, his sister Katharine and Mrs Berg narrowly escaped injury when their train collided with another and was wrecked at Dax. In the following month King Alphonso of Spain joined their party and was introduced to the Wrights by Berg who was reported, somewhat improbably, to have dissuaded the king from becoming Wilbur’s passenger.

In March King Edward VII visited them and in April they met King Victor Emmanuel in Rome where they had come to discuss sales to the Italian military. Berg has been credited with establishing the Centocelle airfield for demonstration flights on the latter occasion, (Note: In preparation for the flights Berg had been at Rome during the previous month and had a meeting with Pope Pius X who expressed the hope that Wright would fly directly over the Vatican so its occupants might see his machine; although such overflight did not take place, Vatican interest was stimulated to the extent it was “rumoured the Sacred Congregation of Rites has approved a new and very beautiful form of blessing for aeroplanes”: Morning Press, 26 March 1909, p. 1; Dublin Evening Telegraph, 16 April 1909, p. 2.) and it was there, from a balloon, that he took what was probably the first aerial photograph of Wilbur in flight. During these royal encounters Wilbur explained his plane’s mechanism to the visitors in English but, when fluency in a foreign tongue was required, Berg provided the explanation - as when the machine was shown to President Fallières of France and to the German Crown Prince Wilhelm and his family later in the year. By the time of the Crown Prince’s visit, a syndicate of investors had incorporated Flugmaschine Wright GmbH to make and market Wright planes in Germany. The Wrights subscribed one third of its capital and Berg was a member of its supervisory board.

In July 1909 Berg was present at Dover when Louis Blériot made his celebrated crossing of the English Channel in a Blériot XI, winning the challenge prize for which the Wrights had elected not to compete. Following his flight Blériot changed from cork jacket and overalls into garments lent him by Berg. The borrowed jacket’s lapel bore the silk ribbon of Berg’s Legion of Honour: when Blériot began to remove it, Berg stopped him, saying “I’m sure you will have the right to wear it very soon”. On the following day Blériot was made a Knight of the order and Berg was advanced to the rank of Officer.

In February that year Berg had gone to Hartford to meet his old colleague H. P. Maxim and had purchased the European rights to the gun silencer developed by Maxim. (Note: When King Alphonso visited Pau that same month he lunched with Berg and “discussed with much awareness the changes in warfare produced by modern inventions - submarines... the rifle silencer... and aeroplanes”: Westminster Gazette, 22 February 1909, p. 2.) Berg did not miss the opportunity to promote his aviation interests, telling the press that in warfare silent gunfire would make the airplane essential to locating an enemy whose position was no longer betrayed by sound. He had previously declared that aerial observation had the potential to “checkmate” the deployment of submarines in war.

Flights of Wright aircraft in the Reims Aviation Contests of August 1909 left Berg “beaming with gratification at the compliments showered upon him as an associate in the Wrights’ interests”. Although no government contract had been obtained, orders for planes produced by the French company were initially encouraging. By May, Michel Clemenceau (son of Prime Minister Clemenceau) alone had bought twenty-five machines, but the export of some of these to Germany caused problems with potential German investors. To address the issue Berg, who had from the outset been concerned about the adequacy of the Wrights’ patent protection, prompted a comprehensive programme of intellectual property registration both in Europe and beyond.

== End of relationship with the Wright Brothers ==
The enthusiasm of 1909 dissipated as 1910 proceeded. In Europe the machines turned out by the brothers’ competitors were breaking records and attracting buyers while the Wright model suffered a succession of accidents. In one of these Heinrich Haas, pilot for Flugmaschine Wright, was killed. The accidents were widely attributed to the double-propeller design of the Wright model, and by November 1910 the French, German and Spanish governments had all indicated they would not place an order for twin-screw aircraft. In the previous six months the German company had made only one or two sales and the French company had made none.

Flugmaschine Wright complained that, in addition to the propeller problem, its machine was at a disadvantage because the Wrights had failed to share information about design improvements they had introduced in America. Berg cabled Wilbur asking him to come to Europe urgently and wrote to Flint & Company saying that, on account of the complex construction associated with the twin-screw, he considered “the Wright machine more dangerous than any other machine”. He added that he believed the failure to update the German company with design changes was “a distinct breach of contract”, that he feared both the French and German companies “will be in serious financial difficulties in the near future”, and that he “did not think there will be a buyer anywhere in the world for machines of the Wright type”.

Wilbur Wright shrugged off Berg’s concerns, noting that he and Orville had made about $200,000 from their American operations since July 1909 - “not a bad story for double-propellers etc”. However, Orville went to Berlin and, despite Wilbur’s previous assertion that a single-propeller design was “not possible on account of the gyroscopic action”, he provided the German company with such a design.

In light of Berg’s concerns, Flint & Company tendered their resignation as the Wrights’ European representative, saying “We do so on our own behalf and not on behalf of Mr Berg and trust you can continue relations with him which have proved so pleasant for all of us”. A response to the proffered resignation was postponed until the Wrights, Flint and Berg met in March 1911. No minute of that meeting seems to survive, but subsequent correspondence referred to a “settlement” between the brothers on the one hand and Flint and Berg on the other.

Berg continued as a director of the French and German companies, but the former had exhausted its capital and turned over its operations to Société Astra, to which it was heavily indebted, (Note: Astra was owned by Deutsch de la Meurthe. Orville Wright thought “the whole business in France seems to have been nothing but a graft on the part of the Astra”: Wright Papers - Family Papers: Correspondence - Orville to Wilbur Wright, 24 November 1910.) and the German company closed in 1913 following loss of a Wright patent case. In February 1912 Berg reported from Paris that he had “in every way helped the Wrights’ case along without getting any but negative recognition from them” and that it was “hardly conceivable that we should go on trying to represent them when they have ignored my presence here and have not had any correspondence with me for months”. Wilbur Wright died shortly afterwards.

== Later business activity ==
Other business interests which Berg worked to advance during his period as the Wrights’ representative included those of August Scherl (a shareholder in Flugmaschine Wright) whose gyro monorail system he promoted in America. In 1911 he arranged exhibitions of the system in New York, Philadelphia, Boston, Chicago and St Louis but, although the monorail attracted considerable interest, it failed to secure financial backing.

Following the outbreak of the First World War and the privations which German invasion inflicted on Belgian civilians, Berg was one of the ten-strong executive of the Commission for Relief in Belgium assembled by Herbert Hoover from among successful American engineers considered “well equipped for the work in hand and with leisure to devote to it because the war has suspended so many of the enterprises in which they are interested”.

Among those enterprises which continued to flourish was the French aircraft industry, which was well in advance of that in America. When the United States entered the war in 1917, Berg told Simon Lake he believed he had “the chance to do something for my country”. He held manufacturing drawings for the best airplane currently in French production and a commitment to update them as soon as design improvements emerged. He took to Washington a proposal that these should be used to build an American fleet of military aircraft but, according to Lake, he was first ignored and then insulted by the authorities there. America had to rely on machines built by the French and British for its war effort in the air.

During and after the war years Berg was associated with William A. Hall and Henry Vail Dunham in developing fuel oil technologies, including the production of liquid paraffin and the processes for cracking hydrocarbons, and he promoted the mining of high oil-bearing shale and coal in the Var. He was actively interested in the production of lightweight engineering components, particularly by the use of magnesium in the forging process. In the 1920s he was involved in the supply of magnesium forgings to the French government and to Bréguet Aviation, and reported having interested General Mason Patrick (Chief of the Army Air Service) and “Air Admiral” William Moffett in their use. An American patent in respect of his process for purification of magnesium and its alloys was granted in 1929.

Also in the 1920s he worked with Robert McAllister Lloyd (who two decades earlier had been Secretary and Treasurer of the Berg Automobile Company before becoming President of the Electric Vehicle Company) in the development of machinery to manufacture paper containers for milk and other liquids. The pair were instrumental in establishing the Sealed Milk Containers Company in London and the Sealed Containers Corporation in New York.

Political events had by then resulted in Berg ceasing to have a business presence in Berlin and St Petersburg, but he continued to maintain offices in Paris, London and New York. At the outbreak of the Second World War he left Paris, where he had occupied an apartment on the Champs Elysées for more than thirty years, and took up residence at the Engineers' Club in Manhattan, becoming an unofficial consultant to the United States Ordnance Department. In August 1939 he presented to the Institute of the Aeronautical Sciences his collection of photographs, books and newscuttings related to early aviation and was elected a Benefactor Member of the Institute.

At his death it was reckoned he had crossed the Atlantic almost 150 times in the course of his business. His death occurred, after a long illness, in New York on 9 December 1941.

== Marriage ==
Berg married twice. His first wife, Edith Ogilby Berg, was a Californian-born granddaughter of Sir David Ogilby. (Note: She was a daughter of Robert Edwin Ogilby, who had gone to California in the Gold Rush of 1849, subsequently became a professor of drawing at the University of California, and married the actress Louise Paullin. His View of Grass Valley, Nevada County, 1852, became a popular lithograph. Edith married Charles Bryant Titcomb in 1887, when she was aged nineteen, but they had divorced by 1889; he later married Heloise McCeney, a vaudeville performer better known as La Belle Titcomb. The two women have frequently been confused with one another.) She had formerly been an actress and, under the stage name Edith Paullin, appeared in some of the same productions as her previous husband, the actor and producer Hubert Druce. Having divorced Druce in January 1905, she married Berg at St Clement Danes on 21 February 1906. Wilbur Wright considered her “a jolly woman and very intelligent”, while his sister Katharine thought her “pretty as a picture and about the best dressed woman I ever saw”. She and Berg divorced at Paris in 1922. She afterwards went under the name of Edith Ogilby-Druce and died at San Francisco in August 1949.

In April 1925 Berg married Lena Davis Willits McKinney, the widow of a journalist, in London. She died at Paris in March 1931, aged 57.

There were no children by either of Berg’s marriages, but he was stepfather to Grace Titcomb (the child of Edith Ogilby Berg’s first marriage) who had married Paul Foy, a Paris lawyer, a few months before her mother’s wedding to Berg. It was Foy who in October 1909 conducted the first prosecution for “furious driving in the air”, which followed the crash during an air show at Port-Aviation (often called "Juvisy Airfield") in Viry-Châtillon of a Blériot monoplane flown by Alfred Leblanc into a crowd of spectators, injuring more than a dozen people and killing a woman who became the first person on the ground in history to be killed by a falling airplane.

== Legacy ==
The majesty of Wilbur Wright’s flying display at Le Mans in August 1908 fuelled his competitors’ appetite for further effort and experiment, probably advancing the progress of aviation by a significant measure. Hart Berg’s business skills, practical support and presentational management provided the occasion for, and contributed to the technical and commercial success of, that display. “In 1908,” Jed Rothwell has written, “Berg sold the aeroplane to the world.”

According to Rothwell, without the progress triggered by Wright’s display, notably the development of Thomas Sopwith’s aircraft, the allies would have been defeated in the First World War or, if they had pulled through, would have lost the Battle of Britain twenty years later: he asserts that “Berg, the Wrights, and Sopwith together twice saved Western civilization by narrow margins”.
