= Louise Paullin =

American stage actress (1848–1910)

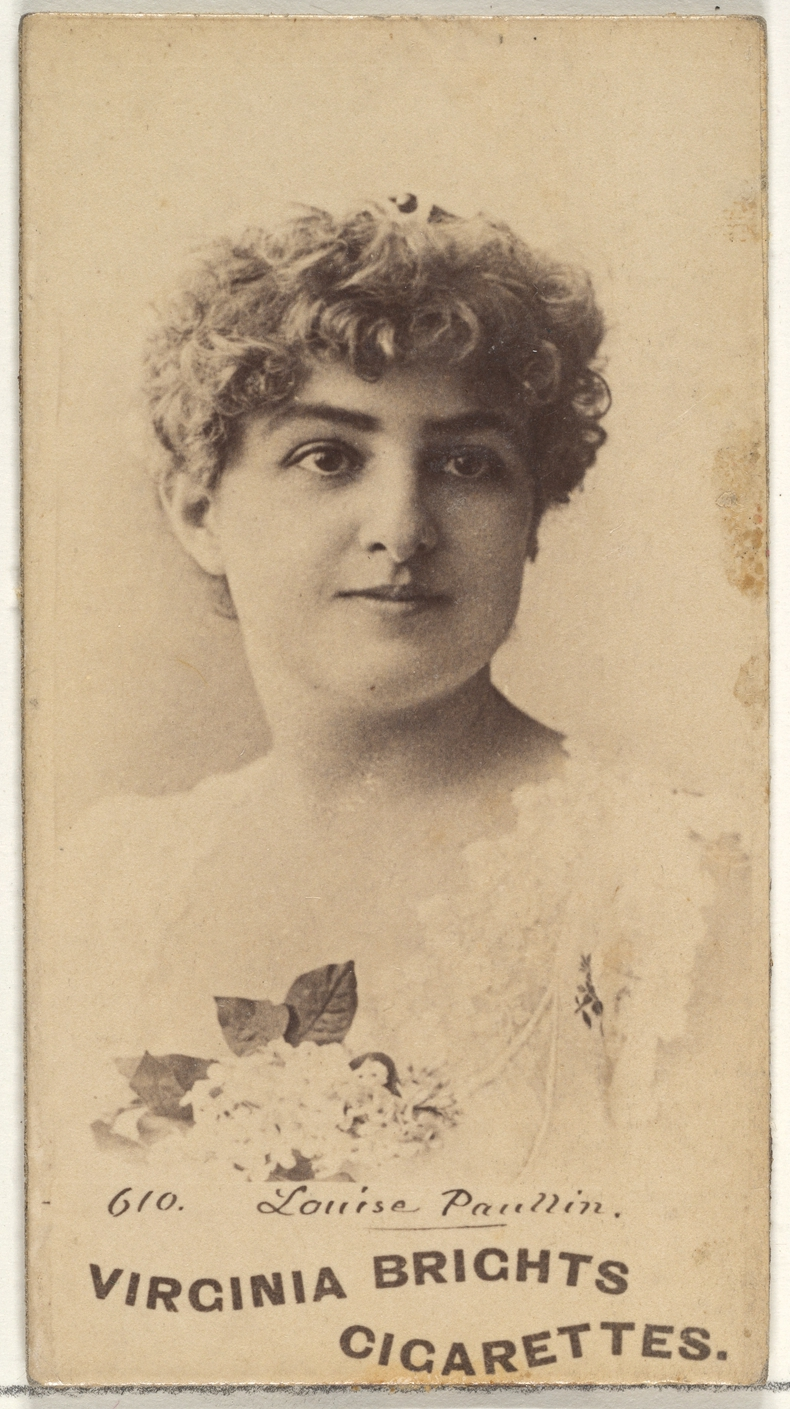
- A cigarette card featuring Louise Paullin, circa 1888, from the Jefferson R. Burdick Collection, Metropolitan Museum of Art
- Born: 1848
- Died: 1910 (aged 61–62); New York
- Other names: Louisa Paullin, Louise Paullin Warner (after second marriage)
- Occupation: actress
- Years active: 1880-1900

Louise Paullin (1848 – 18 April 1910), sometimes seen as Louisa Paullin, was an American stage actress.

== Birth and early life ==
Louise Elizabeth Paullin was born at Biddeford, Maine, in 1848 and was the eldest daughter of James Rue Paullin and his wife Susan Frances Vickery. Her parents were both actors and Louise made her stage debut at an early age when they were living at Boston, Massachusetts. The family relocated to California in 1855 and, in the following year, Louise and her brother Edgar sang and danced in several variety companies either managed by or including her father (said to have twenty years of theatrical experience) and were “very amusing to the audiences”.

In March 1857, as a member of John S. Potter’s company, she appeared at Columbia in “her favourite character Little Pickle” in the two-act burletta The Spoiled Child.Afterwards, the Paullins toured to entertain mining settlements in the Stockton neighbourhood.

In October 1858 some of San Francisco’s most prominent citizens (including E. W. Burr, Thomas O. Larkin and Samuel Purdy) sponsored a benefit performance for “the talented” Louise in the role of “Little Eva” in a Tom show at Maguire’s Opera House, then the city’s principal theatre. She was described as having “often excited her audience to tears” in this role when, in the following year, she made national headlines by running away with a man in his twenties formerly employed by her father and dismissed for displaying inappropriate intimacy towards Louise.

The 11-year-old girl was recognised while travelling on a steamer from San Francisco, bound for Panama, and was taken off the vessel at Acapulco and restored to her parents. In the following month it was announced that her father had removed her from the stage. This came at a particularly inopportune moment for the family: James Paullin had been entirely incapacitated (and was left permanently lame) after breaking a leg some months earlier and Louisa’s earnings of about four dollars a day at the Union Theatre were largely supporting the family.

== Juvenile career ==
Louise was again performing by August 1860 when she played the slave boy “Paul” in an early production of Dion Boucicault’s The Octoroon, at the Metropolitan Theatre in Sacramento, and shortly afterwards she headed the bill as “the well-known and talented comedienne, vocalist and danseuse” in performances by Pickering & King’s Dramatic Troupe at Nevada City. Over the next three years she toured California with various minstrel groups, including those managed by Charley Backus, Billy Burch, and Bray & Carl, and at intervals reprised her character of “Little Eva” in which, in 1863, she was accompanied by her father in the part of “Shelby”.

In 1862 she was travelling with the Backus troupe when the horses drawing the light stage wagon in which she was a passenger broke loose on a downhill run and, in attempting to leap from the vehicle, Louise caught her leg in a wheel and was dragged along for some distance. She survived with no more than serious bruising.

She ceased appearing as a professional entertainer on marriage in 1865 but in the 1870s, under her married name, was one of Oakland’s “most popular choir and concert singers”.

== Later career ==
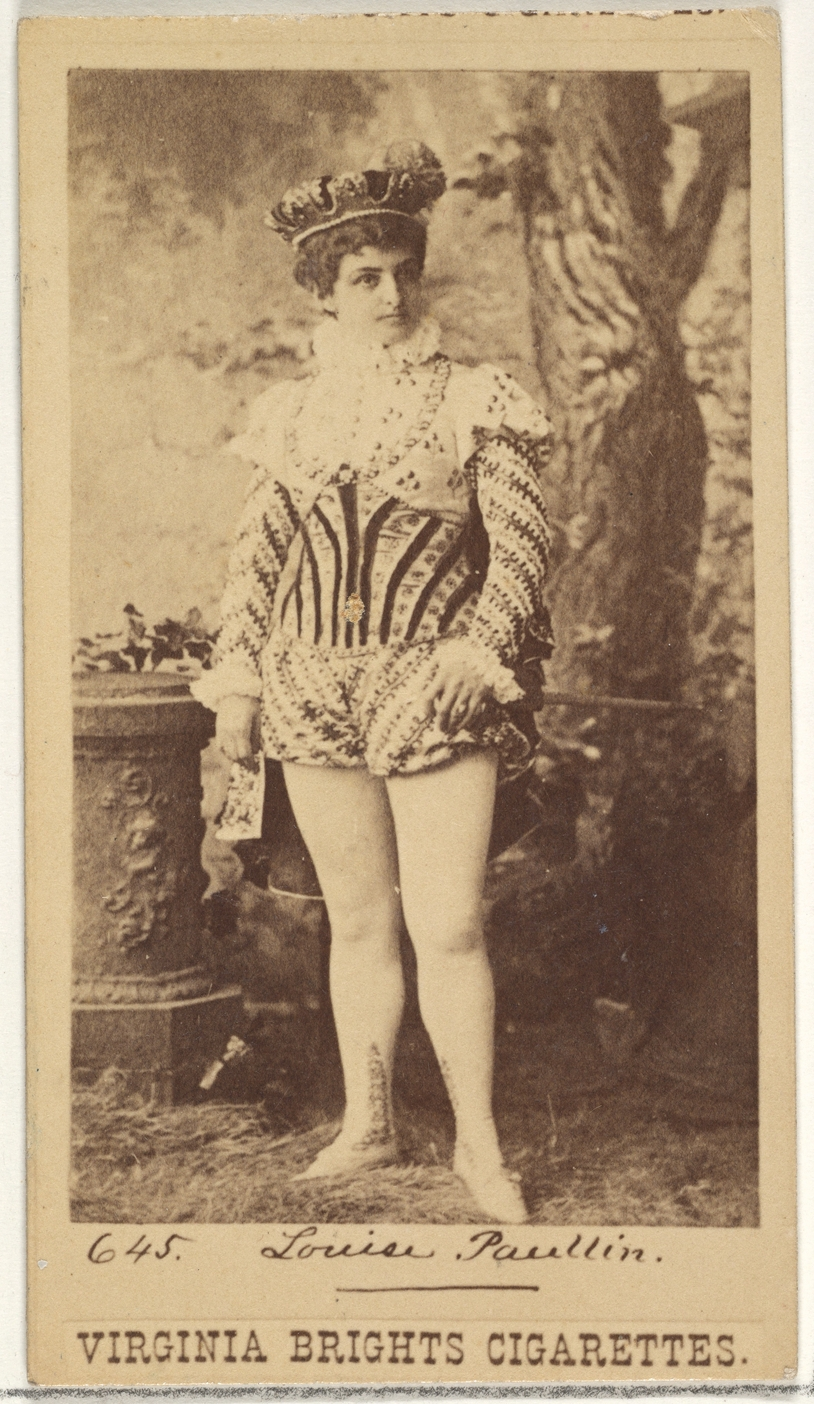
Card 645, Louise Paullin, from the Actors and Actresses series (N45, Type 1) for Virginia Brights Cigarettes MET DP829848

Returning to the stage in 1880, she appeared as “Donna Antonina” in the Emelie Melville Opera Company’s production of Richard Genée’s The Royal Middy at San Francisco’s Bush Street Theatre and then, for the same company and at the same venue, as “Ruth” in The Pirates of Penzance and (alongside Sylvia Gerrish) as “Lieutenant Dragonette” in The Weathercock.

In September the same year she made her first Broadway performance as “Miss Isabella” in William A. Mestayer’s three-act musical play The Tourists in a Pullman Palace Car at New York’s Fifth Avenue Theatre. Under contract with the John A. McCaull Comic Opera Company she next appeared on Broadway in the younger Johann Strauss’s operetta The Queen's Lace Handkerchief at the Casino Theatre. This was staged as the Casino’s inaugural presentation in October 1882, and the cast, with Paullin in the role of the King and Lily Post as the Queen, were supported by a chorus of sixty and an orchestra of forty. She toured Philadelphia, Chicago and other cities with this production, returning in late December for its further one hundred and thirty performances at the Casino. With Lillian Russell, Madeleine Lucette Ryley and Digby Bell she appeared in the McCaull production of Gilbert and Sullivan’s The Sorcerer at the Casino in 1883.

In 1884 she was seen in the adaptation Fantine at the Boston Museum and toured theatres in Massachusetts, New Hampshire and Pennsylvania in the Boston-based “Grand Fairy Musical Ballet Spectacle” Zanita.

Returning to California in 1885, she joined William T. Carleton’s Opera Company and took the title role in Genée’s Nanon in which she gave, said the Daily Alta’s critic, “a delightful performance… her singing having very much improved since we used to hear her in the Emelie Melville troupe and she is more beautiful than ever”. With the same company she played “Yum-Yum” in The Mikado at the Baldwin Theatre in San Francisco and afterwards on local tour. On leaving the company she was replaced by Fanny Rice.

In 1889 she starred in Ardriell, a comic opera staged at the Broadway Union Square Theatre. Critic Alan Dale commented that "Miss Paullin can certainly make herself heard, and that is about all that can be favorably said about her performance, which was characterized by an intense lack of refinement, and a pretty well defined mispronunciation of the English language." The correspondent for London’s The Era was less hostile in his review: although dismissing the production as a triviality, he found its principal redeeming feature was that “Miss Paullin sang well in the title role”. In 1897 she appeared as “Juliette” in The Geisha at Chicago’s Columbia Theatre.

Paullin tried her hand at adapting a musical comedy from the German in 1888, when she wrote Our Baby's Nurse, which was produced that year in Philadelphia. She was a popular face on cigarette cards in the 1880s. She also lent her image to endorse "Burdock Blood Bitters", a digestive aid, Lion Coffee, skin care products, and Vin Mariani.

== Lawsuit ==
In 1886, Paullin lost a purse containing over $1,500 at a Philadelphia theatre, after she fainted on stage during The Bohemian Girl. She sued the stage manager of the Carleton Opera Company, Charles Caspar Fais, saying that he stole the money from her. The case was tried in Philadelphia in 1888, and was in the New York headlines for a week, until "the real thief", the prop man at the theatre, confessed that he found the money and spent most of it.

== Personal life ==
Louise Paullin married twice. Her first husband, Robert Edwin Ogilby (a son of Sir David Ogilby), had gone to California during the Gold Rush and, in addition to pursuing mining interests, became a drawing instructor at the University of California. The couple were living in the household of Louisa’s parents at San Francisco in 1880 with their two daughters Clara, aged 15, and Edith, aged 12. Edith became an actress, under the name Edith Paullin, and was several times married, lastly to Hart O. Berg.

In 1883, Louisa was living at 183 Lexington Avenue, New York City, under her married name of Ogilby, and in September 1885, described as a widow, she married the theatrical agent Henry B. Warner in Manhattan. She died in New York on 18 April 1910, at which time her wealth was estimated at $250,000. Her husband, Warner, had died on August 28 in the previous year and, like him, she was cremated at Rosehill, Linden, New Jersey.
