= Brown–Koerner House =

Historic house in Virginia, United States

- U.S. National Register of Historic Places
- U.S. Historic district
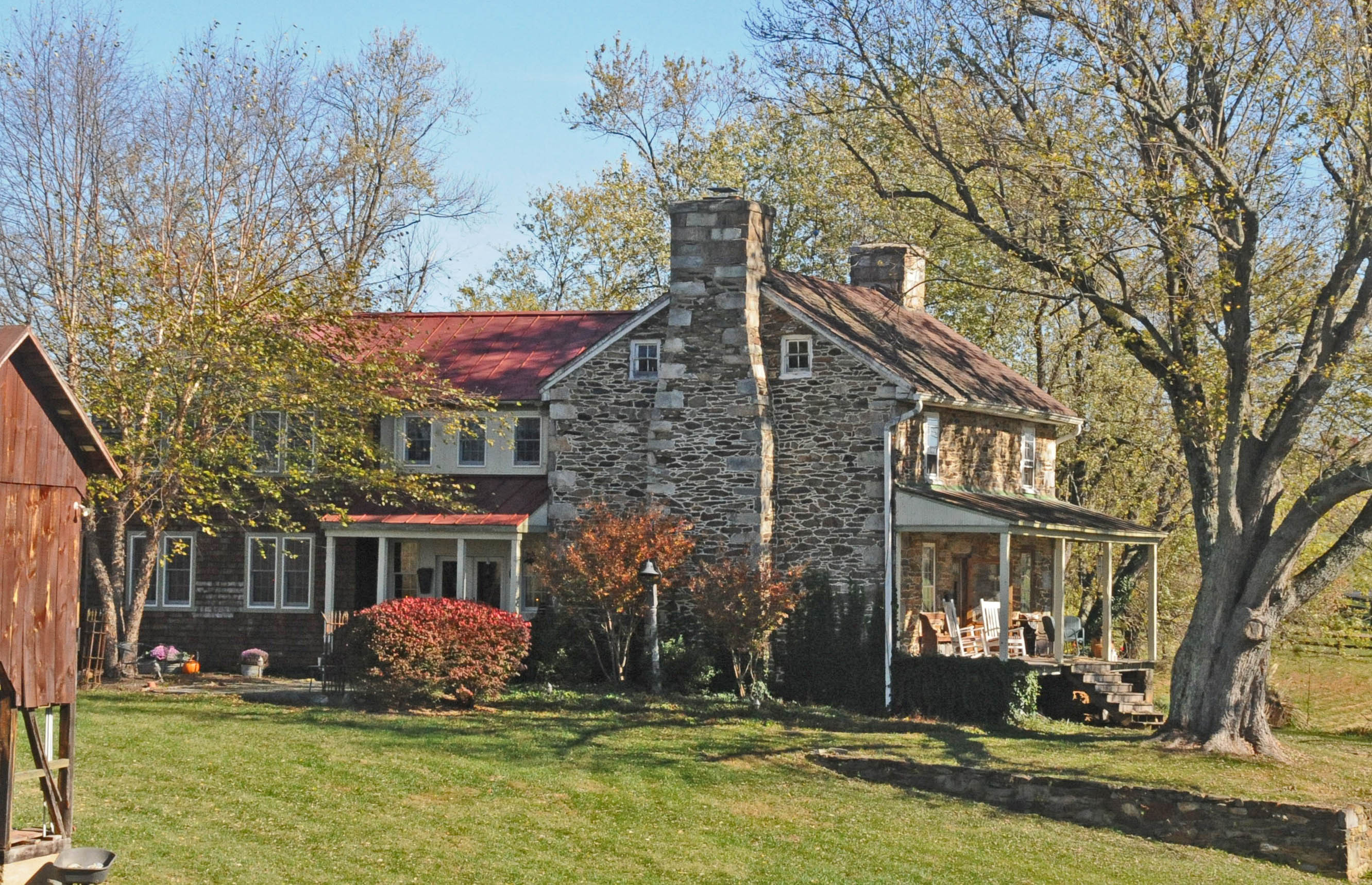
- Location: 38340 Winsome Trail Ln., near Purcellville, Virginia
- Coordinates: 39°10′23″N 77°40′28″W
- Area: 14.6 acres (5.9 ha)
- Built: c. 1815
- Architectural style: Federal
- NRHP reference No.: 16000531
- Added to NRHP: August 15, 2016

The Brown–Koerner House is a historic farm property at 38340 Winsome Trail Lane, in rural Loudoun County, Virginia northeast of Purcellville. The centerpiece of the property is a two-story stone farmhouse built about 1815, along with a period springhouse and retaining wall. It is a fine example of period domestic architecture, and remains relatively isolated despite the loss to development of surrounding land that once formed part of the property.

The property was listed on the National Register of Historic Places in 2016.

Susan Catherine Koerner Wright, the mother of aviation pioneers Wilbur and Orville Wright, was born on April 30, 1831, to Catherine and John Koerner, and lived in the house for the first year of her life before it was sold by her family.

== See also ==
- National Register of Historic Places listings in Loudoun County, Virginia
