= Milton Wright (bishop) =

Father of the Wright brothers, protestant bishop (1828–1917)

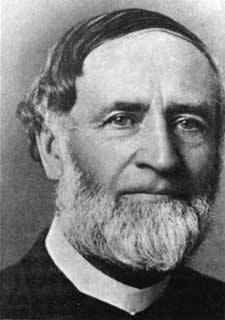
- Wright circa 1889
- Born: November 17, 1828; Rushville, Rush County, Indiana, U.S
- Died: April 3, 1917 (aged 88); Oakwood, Montgomery County, Ohio, U.S
- Occupation: Bishop of the Church of the United Brethren in Christ
- Known for: Father of the Wright brothers; Founder of United Theological Seminary
- Spouse: Susan Catherine Koerner Wright
- Children: Reuchlin Wright (1861–1920); Lorin Wright (1862–1939); Wilbur Wright (1867–1912); Otis & Ida (1870); Orville Wright (1871–1948); Katharine Wright (1874–1929)

Milton Wright (November 17, 1828 – April 3, 1917) was an American bishop of the Church of the United Brethren in Christ, best known today for being the father of aviation pioneers Wilbur and Orville Wright, as well as suffragette Katharine Wright Haskell.

== Family ==
Milton Wright was the son of Dan Wright and Catherine Wright (Reeder), daughter of George Reeder and Margaret Van Cleve. Margaret Van Cleve was one of the earliest women of European ancestry to settle in the Miami River basin.

Milton met his future wife, Susan Catharine Koerner, b. 1831, d. July 4, 1889, at Hartsville College in 1853, where he was appointed as supervisor of the preparatory department and she was a literature student. After a long courtship, Milton asked Susan to marry him and accompany him on his assignment by the church to Sublimity, Oregon. She declined, but agreed to marry him when he returned. They married in 1859 when he was almost 31 and she was 28.

Both shared a love of learning for the sake of learning. Their home had two libraries — the first consisted of books on theology, the second was a large, varied collection. Looking back on his childhood, Orville once commented that he and his brother had

"special advantages...we were lucky enough to grow up in a home environment where there was always much encouragement to children to pursue intellectual interests; to investigate whatever aroused their curiosity."

=== Children ===
Susan and Milton had seven children. Four sons and one daughter survived past infancy. Their first son, Reuchlin, was born in a log cabin in 1861 near Fairmount, Indiana. The second son, Lorin, was born in 1862 in Orange Township, Fayette County, Indiana. Wilbur was born April 16, 1867, near Millville, Indiana. The fourth and fifth children, twins Otis and Ida, were born February 25, 1870, at Dayton, Ohio, but died shortly thereafter, on March 9 and 14 respectively. Orville and Katharine were both born in Dayton on August 19, he in 1871 and she in 1874.

None of the Wright children had middle names. Instead, their father tried hard to give them distinctive first names. Reuchlin was named for Johann Reuchlin, and Lorin was named by his parents for a community chosen randomly from a map. Wilbur was named for Wilbur Fisk and Orville for Orville Dewey, both clergymen that Milton Wright admired. Wilbur and Orville were "Will" and "Orv" to their friends, and "Ullam" and "Bubs" to each other. In Dayton, their neighbors knew them simply as the "Bishop's kids." Because of Milton's position in the church, the Wrights moved frequently — twelve times before finally returning permanently to Dayton in 1884.

== Church service ==
Milton joined the Church of the United Brethren in Christ in 1846 because of its stand on political and moral issues including alcohol, the abolition of slavery, and opposition to "secret societies" such as Freemasonry.

=== Indiana and Oregon ===
From 1855 to 1856, he served as an itinerant minister of the Church of the United Brethren in Indianapolis. He was ordained in 1856 and was pastor in Andersonville, Indiana, from 1856 to 1857. Later that year, he went to Oregon as a missionary and served as pastor at Sublimity and first president of Sublimity College, a denominational institution.

Wright returned from Sublimity in 1859 and was assigned by the church as a circuit preacher in eastern Indiana, where he also served as presiding elder and pastor in Hartsville, Indiana. From 1868 to 1869, he was professor of theology at Hartsville College.

=== Ohio and Iowa ===
In 1869, Milton became editor of the national weekly church newspaper, the Religious Telescope, and moved to the newspaper's headquarters of Dayton, Ohio; with this new position, his income increased from $900 per year to $1500 per year. The position gave him prominence within the church and helped him get elected as a bishop in 1877.

In 1871, he founded United Theological Seminary in Dayton.

Bishop Wright continued to advance in the church hierarchy. In 1878, he assumed responsibility for the Western conferences of the church and moved his family to Cedar Rapids, Iowa. Westfield College in Illinois, gave him the degree of D.D. in 1878.

He traveled widely on church business, but always sent back many letters and often brought presents home. His gifts stimulated his children's curiosity and exposed them to a world beyond their immediate surroundings. Returning from one of his travels, he brought Wilbur and Orville a toy helicopter. The helicopter was made of bamboo, cork, paper and powered by rubber bands. When the toy broke, the boys made several copies. Orville said the toy helicopter kindled the brothers' interest in flight.

=== Division in the church ===
By 1881, the leadership of the Church of the United Brethren in Christ was becoming more liberal. Milton Wright, a staunch conservative, failed to be re-elected to his Bishop's post. The Wrights moved to Richmond, Indiana, where Milton served a circuit preacher once again. He served as presiding elder in the White River conference from 1881 to 1885. He also founded a monthly religious newspaper, The Star, for fellow conservatives in 1883.

As the liberals in his church began to press for change, Milton Wright sensed there would be a showdown with the conservatives. Wanting to get back into the fray, he decided to move back to Dayton, the political center of the Church of the United Brethren in Christ, in 1884. It was the last time he would move his family. Wright was once more elected bishop in 1885. He was to spend the next four years serving the Pacific Coast district.

The anticipated showdown came at the 1889 General Conference in York, Pennsylvania. The church leadership wanted to give local conferences proportional representation at the General Conference, allow laymen to serve as delegates to General Conference, and allow United Brethren members to hold membership in secret societies. The procedure for amending the Constitution made amendments all but impossible, since passage required a two-thirds supermajority of all church members. However, the leadership made the changes anyway, saying they were necessary for the good of the church.

A minority claimed the changes weren't valid since they weren't approved by the full membership. Wright was the only bishop to side with the minority. He and 14 delegates, representing 10,000 to 15,000 church members, left the meeting and reconvened at a new location. Contending that those supporting the changes had effectively seceded from the denomination, they declared themselves to be the true United Brethren Church. To distinguish themselves from the majority faction, the minority called itself the Church of the United Brethren in Christ (Old Constitution), also called the "Radicals."

The minority faction elected Wright as bishop. He was faced with having to rebuild from scratch; nearly all of the congregations who sided with the minority lost their property. Wright's sons Wilbur and Orville provided publishing services for the new organization until a publishing house could be established in Huntington, Indiana. Wright also provided valuable support to Huntington College (now Huntington University), established by the Old Constitution branch in 1897.

=== Keiter controversy ===
At the turn of the century, Wright was adamant about prosecuting the publishing house agent, Millard Keiter, who was accused of embezzling. Many members of the publishing board supported Keiter. Because of the controversy, Wright's home district, the White River Conference, voted to rescind his license as minister. The General Conference overruled the home conference in 1905, reinstating Wright. Keiter moved to Kentucky, where he was indicted for land fraud.

=== Retirement ===
Milton Wright retired in 1905. In late September 1908, he was in Le Mans, France, where Wilbur was flying, and got access tickets signed by Hart O. Berg to the venues, the Hippodrome of Hunaudieres, and the Military area of Champ the Tir d'Auvours.

In 1910, he permitted that two family members may fly in the same airplane. Orville took his 82-year-old father on a nearly 7-minute flight, the only powered aerial excursion of Milton Wright's life. The aircraft rose to about 350 feet (107 m).

He died in 1917.

== See also ==
- List of bishops of the United Methodist Church
