= Katharine Wright Haskell =

American teacher and suffragist (1874–1929)

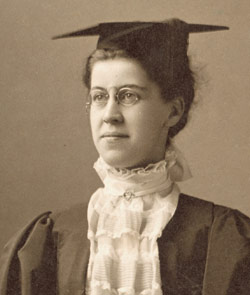
- Wright in 1898 as a graduate of Oberlin College
- Born: Katharine Wright; August 19, 1874; Dayton, Ohio, U.S.
- Died: March 3, 1929 (aged 54); Kansas City, Missouri, U.S.
- Education: Oberlin College (B. A., 1898)
- Occupation: Teacher
- Spouse: Henry Joseph Haskell (m. 1926)
- Parents: Milton Wright; Susan Catherine Koerner Wright
- Relatives: Reuchlin Wright (brother); Lorin Wright (brother); Wilbur Wright (brother); Otis Wright (brother); Ida Wright (sister); Orville Wright (brother)

Katharine Wright Haskell (née Wright; August 19, 1874 – March 3, 1929) was an American teacher, suffragist, and the younger sister of aviation pioneers Wilbur and Orville Wright. She pursued a professional career as a high school teacher in Dayton, Ohio and also managed her brothers' bicycle shop during their trips to Kitty Hawk. She acted as their right-hand woman and aide when the brothers demonstrated their airplanes in Europe, assisting with their correspondence, business affairs, and interactions with royals and captains of industry; she became an international celebrity along with them. A significant figure in the early-twentieth-century women's movement, she worked on behalf of woman's suffrage in Ohio and served as the third female trustee of Oberlin College.

== Early years ==
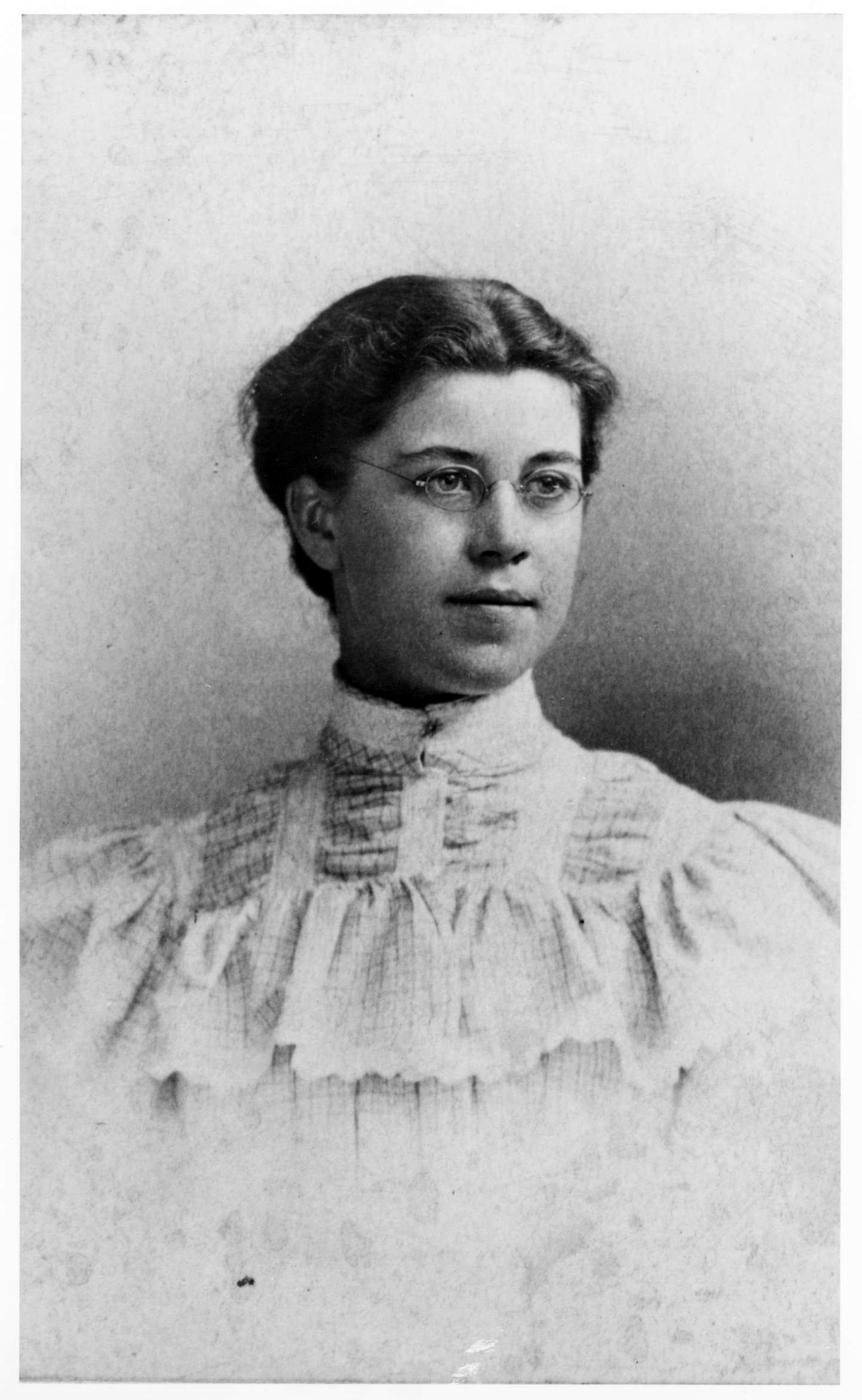
Wright around age 16 in 1890

Katharine Wright was born in Dayton, Ohio, on August 19, 1874, exactly three years after Orville Wright. She was the youngest of five surviving children of Bishop Milton Wright and Susan Koerner Wright. Her mother died of tuberculosis in 1889. Throughout her teenage years and early adulthood, she pursued her education and teaching career while managing the home she shared with her father, an itinerant preacher, and older brothers. She was close to Wilbur and Orville, providing moral and material support as they worked in aviation. (The two oldest Wright brothers, Reuchlin and Lorin, left home while she was growing up.)

Katharine attended Central High School in Dayton and completed her secondary education at Oberlin Academy in 1893–94. After two years at what was then Oberlin's preparatory division, she attended Oberlin College, one of the few coeducational institutions in the United States at the time. The only Wright sibling to earn a college degree, she graduated in 1898.

Katharine was intellectually curious and determined to become financially independent. Upon graduating from Oberlin, she took a position teaching Latin and English at Steele High School in Dayton. Although she found the work rewarding, she complained of earning less than her male colleagues and being assigned less desirable courses to teach. This early experience of gender inequality in the workplace led to a lifelong commitment to women's rights and education. She hired a teenage maid, Carrie Kayler, for assistance with housework and who would remain with the family for decades.

== Collaboration with brothers ==
The Wright Brothers, having neither independent resources nor government support, funded their aeronautical endeavors with earnings from their bicycle shop. After they began spending summers at Kitty Hawk, North Carolina, in 1901, Katharine helped run the shop, pack supplies for their experiments and handle their official correspondence and relations with the press. As Wilbur and Orville's efforts to market the Wright Flyer took them to Washington, D.C., and Europe, Katharine wrote them letters in which she kept them abreast of the progress of the family businesses, as well as personal and hometown news. She often scolded her unmarried brothers when they failed to keep up their end of the correspondence and warned them against amorous liaisons and other "distractions" that lay in wait for them abroad. Many of Katharine's letters from this and later periods are available as digital scans on the Library of Congress website. (See external links section).

In 1908, after nearly three years' trying, the brothers convinced the U.S. Signal Corps to allow them to test their Flyer for possible sale to the U.S. government at Fort Myer, Virginia. Orville was the pilot for the demonstrations. After a week's successful and record-breaking flights, on September 17, the plane crashed due to a split propeller, killing the passenger, U.S. Army Lieutenant Thomas Selfridge, and seriously injuring Orville, who suffered broken ribs and a broken leg. Katharine took emergency leave from her teaching job to be at his bedside at an Army hospital in northern Virginia. She rarely left Orville's room during his seven-week recuperation and never returned to her career. Orville later said that he would have died without his sister's aid. In the aftermath of the crash, Katharine helped her brothers negotiate a one-year extension of their contract with the Signal Corps.

Katharine was not the only woman contributing important assistance to the brothers. In 1910 they advertised for someone to do 'plain sewing'. They actually meant 'plane sewing' as they needed someone to stitch the fabrics to cover their planes, but the newspaper which published the advert assumed a misspelling and changed the vowel. They hired Ida Holdgreve. When the company closed in 1915 she went on to work as forewoman overseeing many other women sewers at the Dayton-Wright Airplane Company.

== Celebrity ==
Shortly after Orville's hospitalization, Wilbur asked Katharine to sail to France with their recuperating brother. She and Orville joined Wilbur in Pau in early 1909. Katharine dominated the social scene in Europe, considered more outgoing and charming than her described shy brothers. She used French when liaising with European royalty and influential dignitaries like Alfonso XIII, King of Spain, Georges Clémenceau, Alfred Harmsworth, 1st Viscount Northcliffe, and Prince Friedrich Wilhelm of Prussia. She also made three flights with Wilbur while they were in Pau, becoming one of the first women to go up in an airplane.

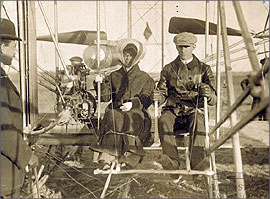
Katharine and her brother Wilbur seated in the Wright Model A Flyer, with Orville standing nearby, in Pau, France in 1909. This was Katharine's first time flying.

French journalists wrote extensively about her, in one instance concocting a story that the "Wright sister" had assisted Wilbur and Orville with their mathematical computations. Katharine would attempt to refute it in later years. In recognition of Katharine's importance to the Wright family team, the French government honored her as an Officier de l'Instruction Publique — one of France's highest academic distinctions — when her brothers received the prestigious Légion d'Honneur in 1909.

The three Wrights returned to the United States as national heroes and international celebrities. Back home in Dayton, Katharine took on formal business responsibilities, serving briefly on the board of the Wright Company before Orville sold the family airplane business in 1915. At the same time, she became an outspoken supporter of the woman suffrage movement in Ohio. In anticipation of an unsuccessful attempt to amend the state constitution, she marched in a suffrage parade in Dayton on October 24, 1914, along with her father and brothers Orville and Lorin. A pioneering feminist, Katharine would later write: "I get all 'het up' over living forever in a 'man's world,' with so much discussion about what kind of women men like and so little concern over what kind of men women like, that it's a good deal like the particular subject of woman suffrage used to be with me. Orv always teased me about that. When we were working for it, he used to say that woman suffrage was like Rome, in one respect: all roads led to it, with me." Katharine traveled to Columbus to lobby state legislators on behalf of woman suffrage. In 1919, Ohio became the fifth state to ratify the Nineteenth Amendment.

== Life after the deaths of Wilbur and Bishop Milton Wright ==
In 1914, two years after Wilbur's death, Katharine, Orville, and Bishop Milton Wright moved to Hawthorn Hill, a newly constructed mansion in the Dayton suburb of Oakwood. Bishop Wright died three years later. Carrie Kayler and her husband, Charles Grumbach, also had an apartment in the house. As his scientific career wound down, Orville became increasingly dependent on Katharine. While continuing to manage the household, she looked after his social schedule, correspondence, and business engagements along with his salaried secretary, Mabel Beck. She played an active behind-the-scenes role in Orville's decades-long struggle with the Smithsonian Institution to gain appropriate recognition for the Wright Brothers' invention.

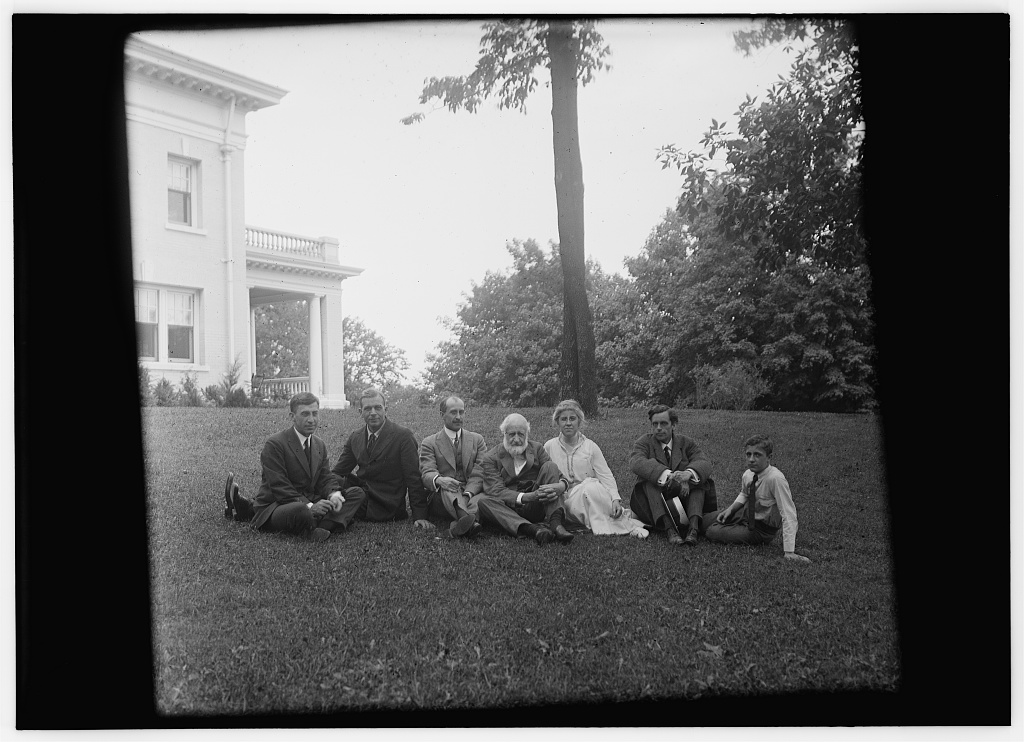
Group picture of Orville Wright, Bishop Milton Wright, Katharine Wright, Earl N. Findley, nephew Horace Wright, John R. McMahon, and Pliny Williamson, all seated on the lawn of Orville's home, Hawthorn Hill; Dayton, Ohio.

As Orville's consort, Katharine attended many formal ceremonies and aviation events, such as the International Air Races in St. Louis in 1923 and Dayton in 1924. In September 1922, they helped the Wright Aeronautical Company christen the Wilbur Wright flying boat, designed by aviation pioneer Grover Loening, and participated in its maiden flight over the Hudson River. At the launch, Katharine and Orville were photographed standing beside Arctic explorer Vilhjalmur Stefansson, whose professional relationship with the youngest Wright brother led to a brief but intense emotional relationship with Katharine in the early 1920s, as documented in their extensive correspondence. Prominent in Dayton society, Katharine was a member of the Helen Hunt Club, a women's literary group; president of the Young Women's League; and a supporter of other civic organizations. She was the moving force behind the Oberlin Alumni Association in Dayton and served as her class secretary for many years. In 1923, she was elected to the Oberlin College board of trustees and served from 1924 until her death in 1929. As only the third female trustee in Oberlin's history, she exerted a strong influence in areas such as faculty and presidential appointments, building plans, and academic freedom.

== Marriage, later life, and death ==
Over the years, Katharine stayed in touch with newspaperman Henry (Harry) J. Haskell, a close friend from her college days who had once tutored her in math. Associate editor (later editor) of the Kansas City Star, Haskell lived in Kansas City, Missouri, where Katharine and Orville visited him on several occasions (their older brother Reuchlin and his family also lived in Kansas City.) Haskell was one of a handful of influential journalists who spearheaded the campaign to vindicate the Wright brothers in their dispute with the Smithsonian. After his wife's death in 1923, he and Katharine began a long-distance romance that was conducted primarily through letters. Although her secret fiancé and Orville had long been friends, Katharine was apprehensive about her brother's likely reaction to their marriage. Haskell belatedly broke the news to Orville: the surviving Wright brother was devastated and virtually stopped speaking to his sister.

Katharine finally married Harry on November 20, 1926, in a small private ceremony at the Oberlin home of their mutual friend Professor Louis Lord, a well-known classicist. Orville, convinced that his sister had violated a family pact to remain unmarried, refused to attend the wedding and severed all contact with his sister. Other family members were more supportive, however, and one of Katharine's nieces even attended the ceremony with her husband. Leaving Hawthorn Hill in secret and with a heavy heart, Katharine made her new home with Harry in Kansas City. Although they enjoyed a happy marriage, she continued to grieve over her relationship with Orville.

In early 1929, as the Haskells were preparing to embark on their belated honeymoon in Europe, Katharine contracted pneumonia. When Orville found out, he still refused to contact her. Their brother Lorin, who had enthusiastically supported Katharine's marriage plans, prevailed on Orville to visit her, and he was at her bedside when she died on March 3, 1929, at age 54.

== Legacy ==
In a posthumous citation, Katharine's fellow Oberlin trustees described her as "a world figure who emerged from and dwelt in a model American home." In 1931 Haskell donated a fountain to the college in her memory. Featuring a replica of a bronze sculpture by Verrocchio, it stands near the entrance to the Allen Memorial Art Museum, a short distance from the college's Wilbur and Orville Wright Laboratory of Physics.

Books published in the first decades of the 21st century reflect an effort to bring more attention to Katharine's place in the Wright brothers' saga. Richard Maurer's The Wright Sister and Ian Mackersey's The Wright Brothers were both published to coincide with the centenary of the first flight in 2003; David McCullough's The Wright Brothers (2015) offered a new look at the lives of family members. In 2017, Henry J. Haskell's grandson published Maiden Flight, a work of creative nonfiction about Katharine's late-life marriage, followed by a three-part biographical podcast titled In Her Own Wright. Novelist Patty Dann adopted a less rigorously source-based approach in The Wright Sister (2020). Dramatic treatments of Katharine's life range from one-woman shows to the 2022 opera Finding Wright by composer Laura Kaminsky and librettist Andrea Fellows Fineberg. American author Amanda Flower has written two novels featuring Katharine as a sleuth: To Slip the Bonds of Earth (2024) and Not They Who Soar (2025).

The National Aeronautic Association's Katharine Wright Memorial Trophy, established in 1981, was named in her honor.
