= Wee Grimmet =

Historic house in Pennsylvania, United States

- U.S. National Register of Historic Places
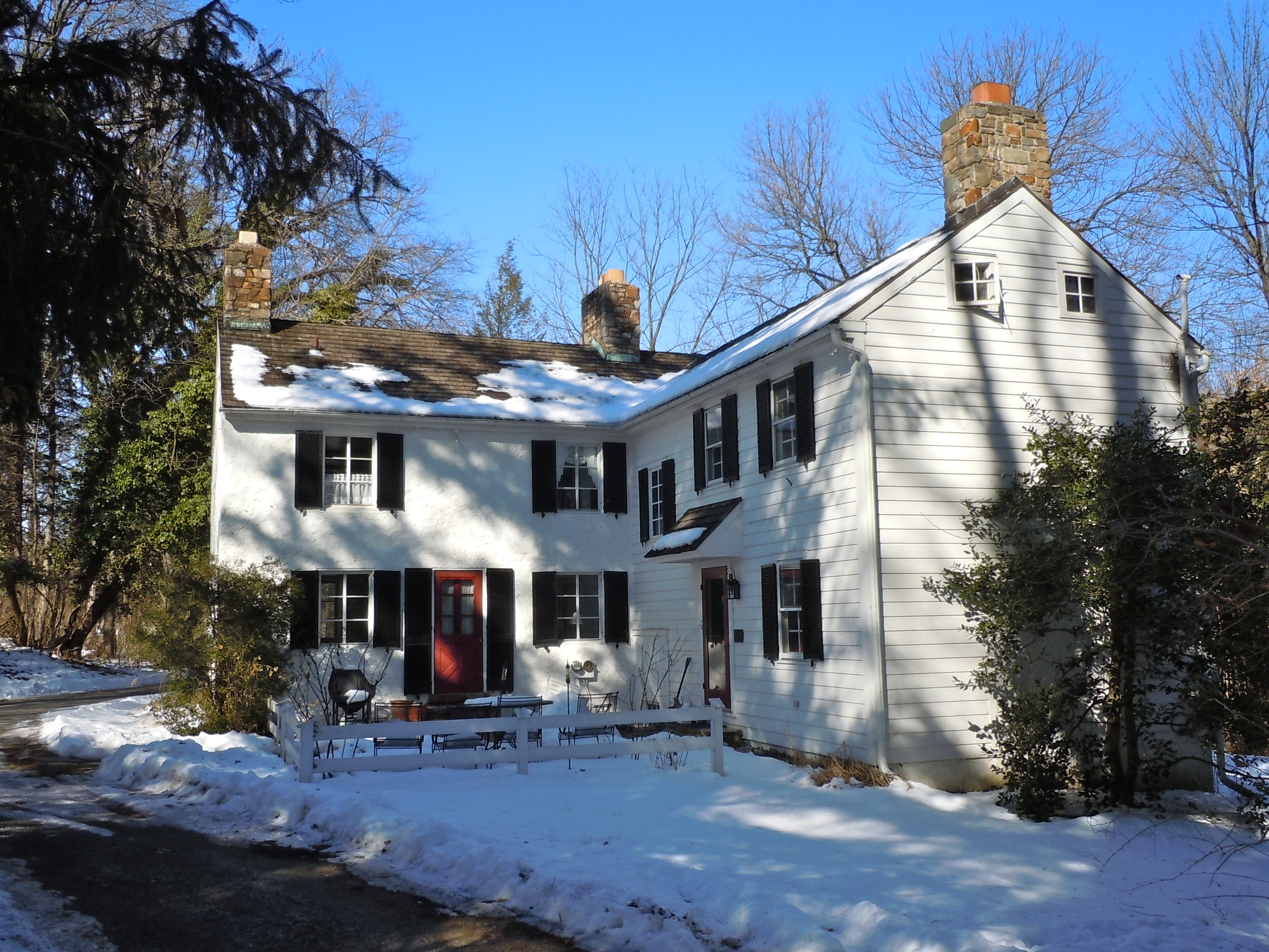
- Wee Grimmet, February 2011

- Location within Pennsylvania Location within the United States
- Location: 624 W. Lincoln Hwy., West Whiteland Township, Pennsylvania
- Coordinates: 40°1′15″N 75°39′42″W
- Area: 1 acre (0.40 ha)
- Built: c. 1820, c. 1929
- Architect: McIlvaine, Gilbert
- MPS: West Whiteland Township MRA
- NRHP reference No.: 84003312
- Added to NRHP: August 2, 1984

The Wee Grimmet is an historic home that is located in Whitford, West Whiteland Township, Chester County, Pennsylvania, United States.

It was listed on the National Register of Historic Places in 1984.

== History and architectural features ==
The original section of this historic structure was built circa 1820 and was then expanded in 1929 by architect John Gilbert McIlvaine, a partner of Wilson Eyre. Expanded again in late 1953, it currently has common areas plus four bedrooms, four bathrooms, and five fireplaces. It is located on the Martha and Maurice Ostheimer Estate, along with the larger estate home known as "Grimmet." Wee Grimmet consists of a two-story, stuccoed stone core section with a gable roof. The addition contains a family room, a master bedroom, and two bathrooms. The original house was built as a dwelling for tenant workers in the limestone quarry, salt mine, and kiln nearby.
