= Hartsville, Indiana =

- Town
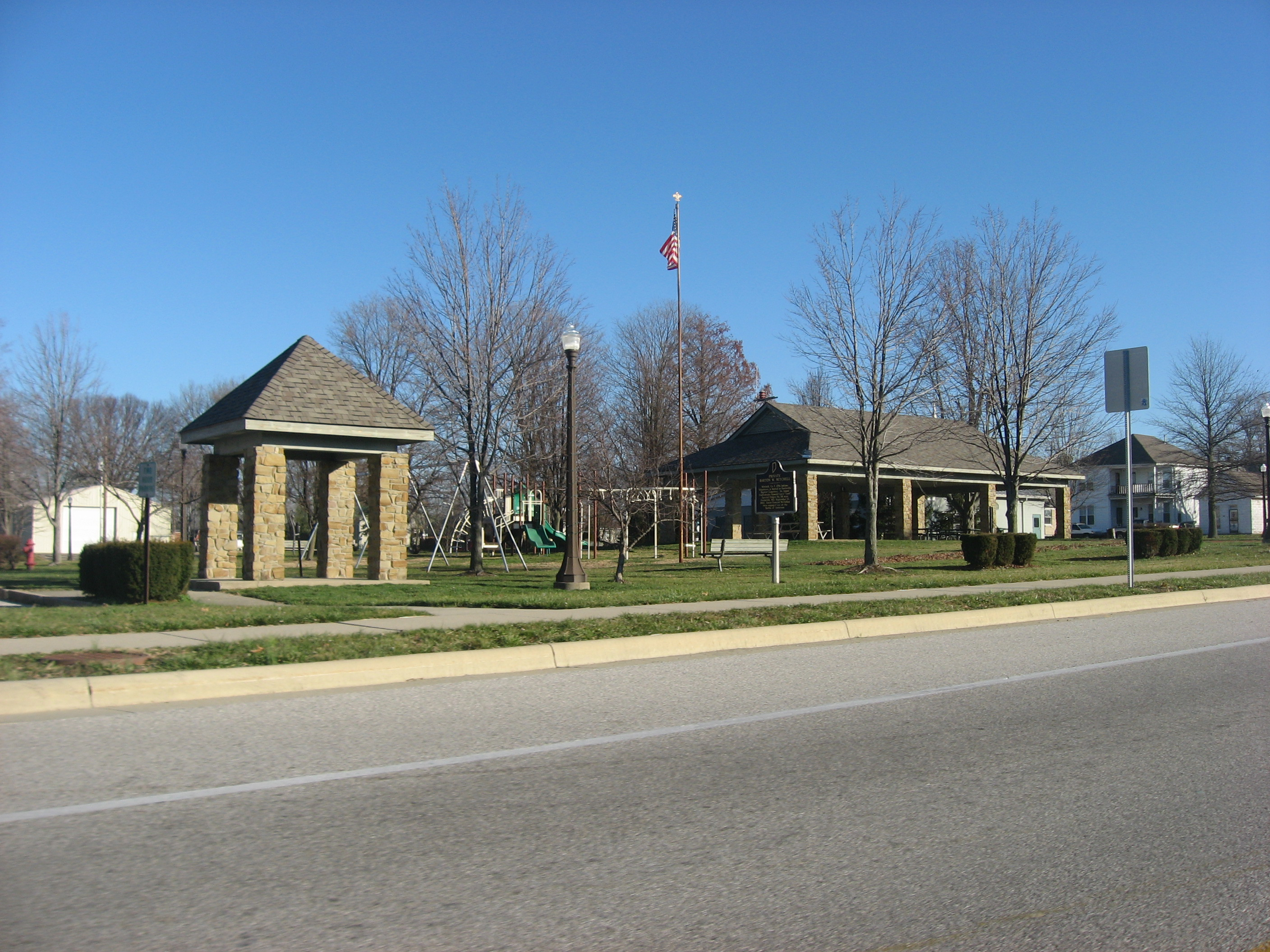
- Hartsville town square

- Location of Hartsville in Bartholomew County, Indiana.
- Coordinates: 39°16′01″N 85°41′57″W
- Country: United States
- State: Indiana
- County: Bartholomew
- Township: Haw Creek, Clifty
- Established: 1832
- Named after: Gideon B. Hart

Area
  - Total: 0.32 sq mi (0.84 km^{2})
  - Land: 0.32 sq mi (0.84 km^{2})
  - Water: 0 sq mi (0.00 km^{2})
- Elevation: 748 ft (228 m)

Population (2020)
  - Total: 317
  - Density: 976.4/sq mi (376.99/km^{2})
- Time zone: UTC-5 (EST)
  - Summer (DST): UTC-5 (EST)
- ZIP code: 47244
- Area code: 812
- FIPS code: 18-32332
- GNIS feature ID: 2396990

Hartsville is a town in Haw Creek and Clifty townships, Bartholomew County, Indiana, United States. The population was 317 at the 2020 census. It is part of the Columbus, Indiana metropolitan statistical area.

== History ==
Hartsville was founded in 1832. It was named for Gideon B. Hart, a pioneer settler. The first post office at Hartsville was established in 1838.

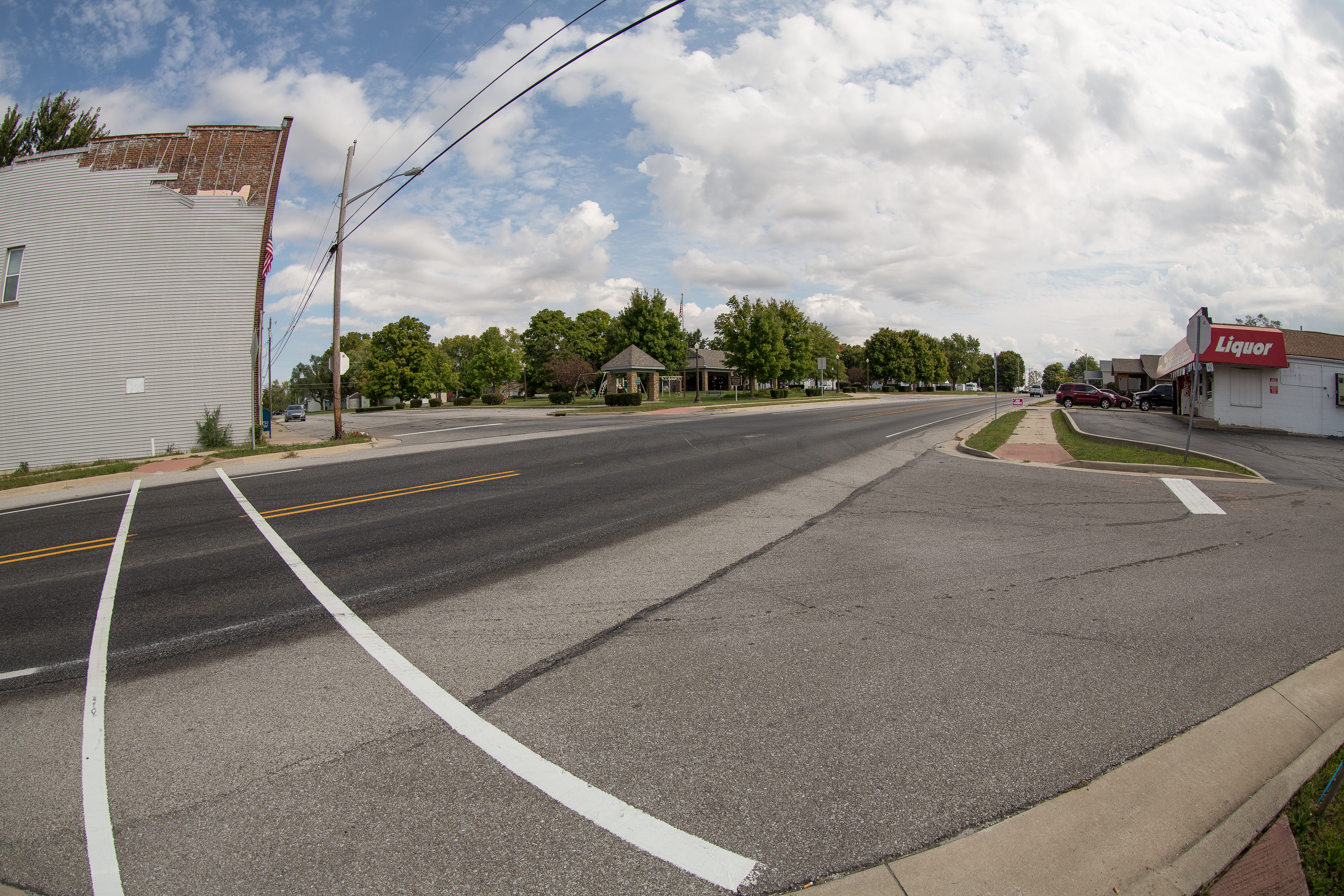
Photo from Small Town Indiana photo survey.

== Geography ==
According to the 2010 census, Hartsville has a total area of 0.34 square miles (0.88 km^{2}), all land.

== Demographics ==
Historical population
Census	Pop.	Note	%±
1860	187		—
1870	433		131.6%
1880	486		12.2%
1890	474		−2.5%
1900	439		−7.4%
1910	358		−18.5%
1920	284		−20.7%
1930	342		20.4%
1940	318		−7.0%
1950	340		6.9%
1960	399		17.4%
1970	434		8.8%
1980	379		−12.7%
1990	391		3.2%
2000	376		−3.8%
2010	362		−3.7%
2020	317		−12.4%
U.S. Decennial Census

=== 2010 census ===
As of the census of 2010, there were 362 people, 132 households, and 98 families living in the town. The population density was 1,064.7 inhabitants per square mile (411.1/km^{2}). There were 148 housing units at an average density of 435.3 per square mile (168.1/km^{2}). The racial makeup of the town was 97.0% White, 1.1% African American, and 1.9% from two or more races. Hispanic or Latino of any race were 1.1% of the population.

There were 132 households, of which 39.4% had children under the age of 18 living with them, 57.6% were married couples living together, 12.1% had a female householder with no husband present, 4.5% had a male householder with no wife present, and 25.8% were non-families. 20.5% of all households were made up of individuals, and 12.8% had someone living alone who was 65 years of age or older. The average household size was 2.74 and the average family size was 3.16.

The median age in the town was 36.5 years. 26.8% of residents were under the age of 18; 8.2% were between the ages of 18 and 24; 26.1% were from 25 to 44; 26.1% were from 45 to 64; and 12.7% were 65 years of age or older. The gender makeup of the town was 47.0% male and 53.0% female.

=== 2000 census ===
As of the census of 2000, there were 376 people, 137 households, and 103 families living in the town. The population density was 1,131.3 inhabitants per square mile (436.8/km^{2}). There were 146 housing units at an average density of 439.3 per square mile (169.6/km^{2}). The racial makeup of the town was 98.67% White, 0.53% Native American, 0.27% Pacific Islander, 0.27% from other races, and 0.27% from two or more races. Hispanic or Latino of any race were 1.86% of the population.

There were 137 households, out of which 35.8% had children under the age of 18 living with them, 60.6% were married couples living together, 7.3% had a female householder with no husband present, and 24.1% were non-families. 19.0% of all households were made up of individuals, and 9.5% had someone living alone who was 65 years of age or older. The average household size was 2.74 and the average family size was 3.07.

In the town, the population was spread out, with 29.8% under the age of 18, 7.7% from 18 to 24, 29.8% from 25 to 44, 19.7% from 45 to 64, and 13.0% who were 65 years of age or older. The median age was 35 years. For every 100 females, there were 104.3 males. For every 100 females age 18 and over, there were 106.3 males.

The median income for a household in the town was $50,000, and the median income for a family was $54,375. Males had a median income of $32,500 versus $22,143 for females. The per capita income for the town was $18,372. About 9.1% of families and 7.7% of the population were below the poverty line, including 10.0% of those under age 18 and 9.3% of those age 65 or over.

== Hartsville College ==
Hartsville was also home to Hartsville College, which was chartered as Hartsville Academy on January 12, 1850. The college was absorbed into the recently created Central College, currently Huntington University, on July 15, 1897, resulting in Hartsville becoming a feeder academy to Central College. On January 30, 1898, it was burned down to the ground; the fire was believed to be the result of arson. Milton Wright, father of Orville and Wilbur Wright, was also the presiding elder and pastor in Hartsville. He was professor of theology at Hartsville College during 1868 and 1869. Milton Wright had met his future wife Susan when they were both students there in 1853.

== Notable people ==
- George Tremain, Justice of the Indiana Supreme Court
