= Susan Catherine Koerner Wright =

Mother of the Wright brothers (1831–1889)

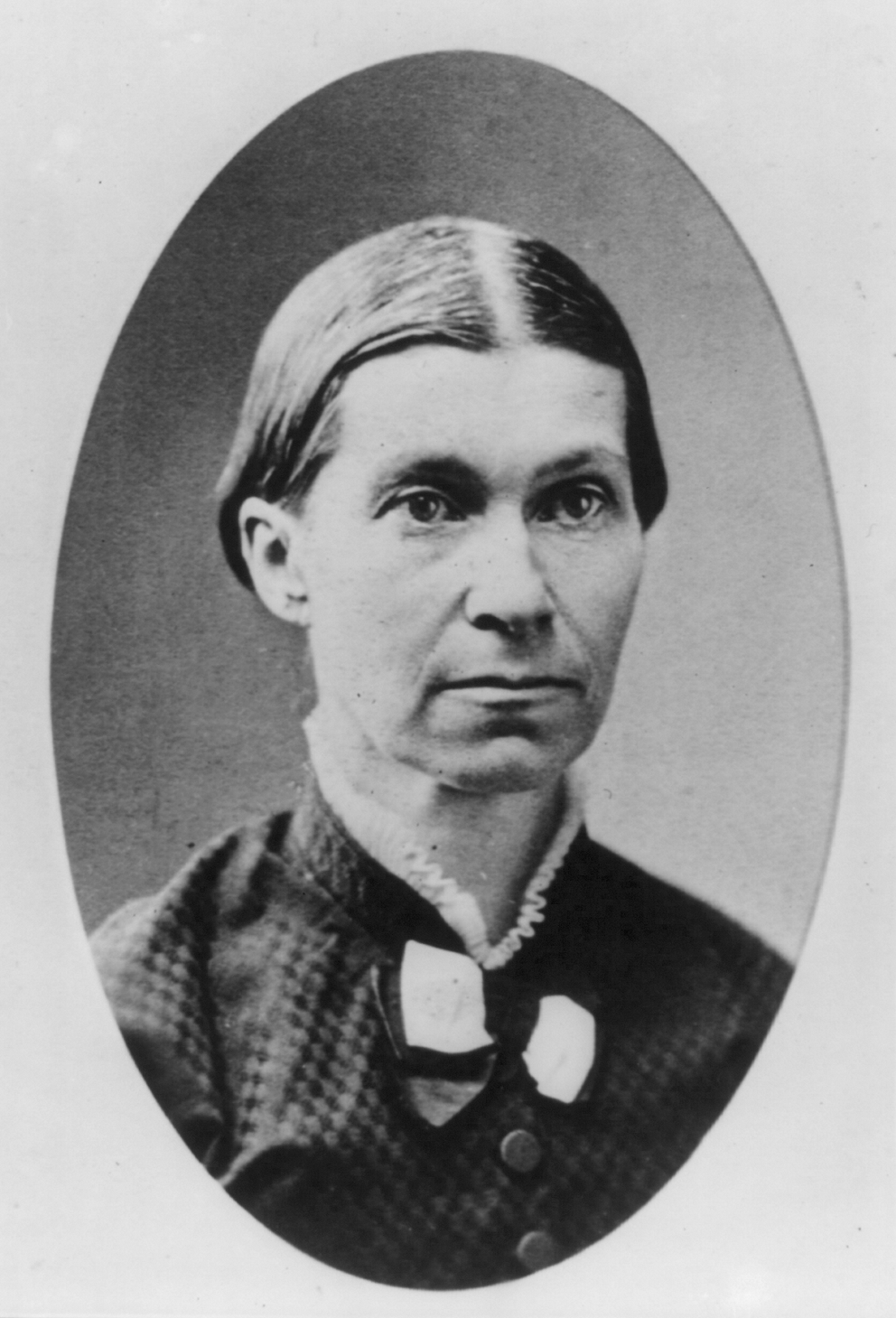
- Wright, c. 1888
- Born: Susan Catherine Koerner; April 30, 1831; Hillsboro, Loudoun County, Virginia, US
- Died: July 4, 1889 (aged 58); Dayton, Ohio, US
- Resting place: Woodland Cemetery and Arboretum, Dayton, Montgomery County, Ohio
- Known for: Mother of the Wright brothers
- Spouse: Milton Wright (m. 1859)
- Children: Reuchlin Wright (1861–1920); Lorin Wright (1862–1939); Wilbur Wright (1867–1912); Otis & Ida (1870); Orville Wright (1871–1948); Katharine Wright (1874–1929)

Susan Catherine Koerner Wright (née Koerner; April 30, 1831 – July 4, 1889) was the mother of aviation pioneers Wilbur and Orville Wright and suffragette Katharine Wright Haskell, and the wife of bishop Milton Wright. She gave birth to seven children, and fostered in them an interest in carpentry and mechanics with her deep skills in those areas.

== Early life ==
Susan Wright was born on April 30, 1831, to Catherine Freyer (or Fry) Koerner and John (Johann) Gottlieb Koerner, and lived in the family home, the Brown-Koerner House of Hillsboro, Virginia, for the first year of her life. Her mother, Catherine, was the tenth of twelve children born in Loudoun County, Virginia. Catherine married John in Loudoun on April 10, 1820. John was a wagon and carriage maker by trade, having apprenticed in Saxony, Germany. He emigrated to the United States in 1817 or 1818 where he continued as a carriage maker, first in Baltimore, Maryland, then in Hillsboro where he moved with his wife's family. After Susan's birth, the family moved to Union County, Indiana. Susan's father, John, had been a Presbyterian but converted to the Church of the United Brethren in Christ after arriving in Indiana. In 1845, Susan was baptized in the faith as well. She loved to read and excelled in mathematics and science, and spent time in her father's workshop developing skills working with tools and solving mechanical problems.

Susan attended Hartville College in Indiana, a United Brethren School. While it was unusual at the time for women to attend college, United Brethren was rather progressive for the time. At Hartville, Wright studied literature and continued her studies in science and mathematics. In 1853, she met Milton Wright, who had been appointed as supervisor of the preparatory department. Milton asked her to marry and accompany him on assignment to a church in Oregon, but she declined and agreed to marry him when he returned. Susan and Milton married in 1859; she was 28 and he was 31. Milton had joined the church in 1847, and was ordained in 1856. Susan supported Milton's calling as a clergyman and devoted her life to maintaining their home and children.

== Children ==
Susan gave birth to seven children, but only five survived past infancy. Due to Milton's occupation, the family moved 12 times, living in several places in Indiana.

In 1861, their first son, Reuchlin Wright, named after German theologian Johann Reuchlin (1455–1522), was born on their Grant County farm near Fairmount, Indiana. Lorin Wright, their second son, was born in 1862 on Dan Wright's (Milton's father) farm in Orange Township, Fayette County, Indiana, and Wilbur Wright was born on April 16, 1867, on their farm in Millville, Indiana.

The family then moved to Dayton, Ohio, where they purchased a place under construction at 7 Hawthorn Street which would serve as their home base. On February 25, 1870, Susan gave birth to twins, Otis and Ida, but they died shortly thereafter. Orville and Katharine Wright were born at their 7 Hawthorne Street home, on August 19, 1871, and 1874, respectively. The family then moved to Cedar Rapids, Iowa, and Richmond, Indiana, finally settling back at their Dayton home in 1884. None of the Wright children were given middle names: instead, their father opted to give them distinctive first names; Wilbur and Orville were named after clergymen Milton admired. As a bishop, Milton was well known within the communities in which they lived, and in Dayton the neighbors knew the children as the "Bishop's kids". Milton and Susan kept tight familial bonds and instilled in their children that close family bonds could combat the pressures of the world; Milton admonished the children that only family was safe, reliable, and sustaining.

Despite Milton's consistent travel as a bishop, both he and Susan had major impacts on their children. During his absences Susan would occasionally work as a dress maker and maintained their family and household while supporting the lessons and beliefs her husband worked to teach their children. Unlike him, Susan had a mechanical aptitude which resulted in toys for the kids, such as a sled, which was a favorite of theirs. She also created simple appliances for herself and, as children, Wilbur and Orville consulted her when they needed mechanical assistance or advice. They kept two libraries in their family homes: books of theology in the bishop's study, and a large and diverse collection kept on the first floor, including two full encyclopedias, histories of England and France, works of Robert Ingresoll and Sir Walter Scott, and popular works of science, such as those of Charles Darwin; despite their religious convictions, Susan and Milton desired to maintain intellectual curiosity. The family corresponded with each other extensively; during the Bishop's absence, he wrote not only to Susan, but to each of the children in order to stay up-to-date and involved in their day-to-day lives. He also brought home presents: notably, a toy for Orville and Wilbur (then ages 7 and 11) in 1878—made of cork, bamboo, paper, and twin blades twirled by a rubber band—based on an invention by French aeronautical pioneer Alphonse Pénaud. The boys would later identify the toy as being what sparked their interest in flight.

== Death and legacy ==
In 1883, while they were living near Richmond, Indiana, Susan began to show signs of tuberculosis. Even prior to this illness, she was often in poor health, suffering from malaria, rheumatism, and other maladies during adulthood. The next year, the family returned to their Dayton home and remained there so that Milton could be close to the center of the Church of the United Brethren. Around 1885/1886, Wilbur was injured during an ice skating game with friends, resulting in the loss of his front teeth. Though he had been athletic and vigorous, and his injuries did not seem severe, he subsequently became withdrawn. He would forego attending Yale, remaining mostly home-bound for the next few years while taking care of Susan and reading extensively from the family library. During this time, Milton was part of the conservative side of a split within the United Brethren. In order to limit his influence in the disagreement, he was re-elected bishop and put in charge of the West Coast conferences in California. He refused to move, but was still required to spend a great deal of time out of town. During Milton's absence, Wilbur cared for his mother and kept tabs on the committee rewriting the church constitution for his father. By 1886, Susan was completely invalid, requiring constant care. In June 1889, Milton returned home to find his wife's condition at its worst. On July 4, 1889, she died; Milton wrote in his diary, "...and thus went out the light of my home." Milton continued to acknowledge her death in his diaries throughout the rest of his life, calling her "the sweetest spirit Earth ever knew." On July 6, Susan was buried in what would become the family plot in Woodland Cemetery in Dayton.

Looking back on his childhood, Orville was later quoted as saying that he and Wilbur had "special advantages... we were lucky enough to grow up in a home environment where there was always much encouragement to children to pursue intellectual interests; to investigate whatever aroused their curiosity."
