= Hubert Druce =

English actor and producer

Hubert Druce (May 20, 1870 – April 6, 1931) was an English actor and producer involved with English and American theater for over forty years.

Druce was born as Benjamin Hubert Druce in Twickenham, Middlesex, England, on 20 May 1870.

Before he became an actor, Druce was a writer. He created 52 nondenominational sermons that were sold in London bookstores, and he received 10 shillings for each one that was sold.

Druce's stage debut was at age 17 in Scotland in The Blue Bells of Scotland. Richard Mansfield saw him play Gryphon in Alice in Wonderland two years later and took him to America where he first appeared in 1889 at Palmer's Theatre. He then joined The Sign of the Cross touring company. After some time in productions in New York and London, he appeared in New York in 1912 in The Perplexed Husband, and continued to act in New York and elsewhere in the United States. He portrayed John Hammond in the 1918 silent film My Wife.

Druce continued to write while he was an actor. His novel, Henry Cassland, was widely circulated in England. By the fall of 1928, he had written five plays, with all having been accepted for production.

== Personal life and death ==
Druce was appearing in The Admirable Crichton in March 1931 when he became ill. He died of pneumonia in Post-Graduate Hospital in New York on April 6, 1931, survived by his wife and two children. He was buried in Greenwood Cemetery.

Actress Edith Ogilby Berg was previously married to Druce; they divorced in 1905.
