= Martha and Maurice Ostheimer Estate =

Historic house in Pennsylvania, United States

- U.S. National Register of Historic Places
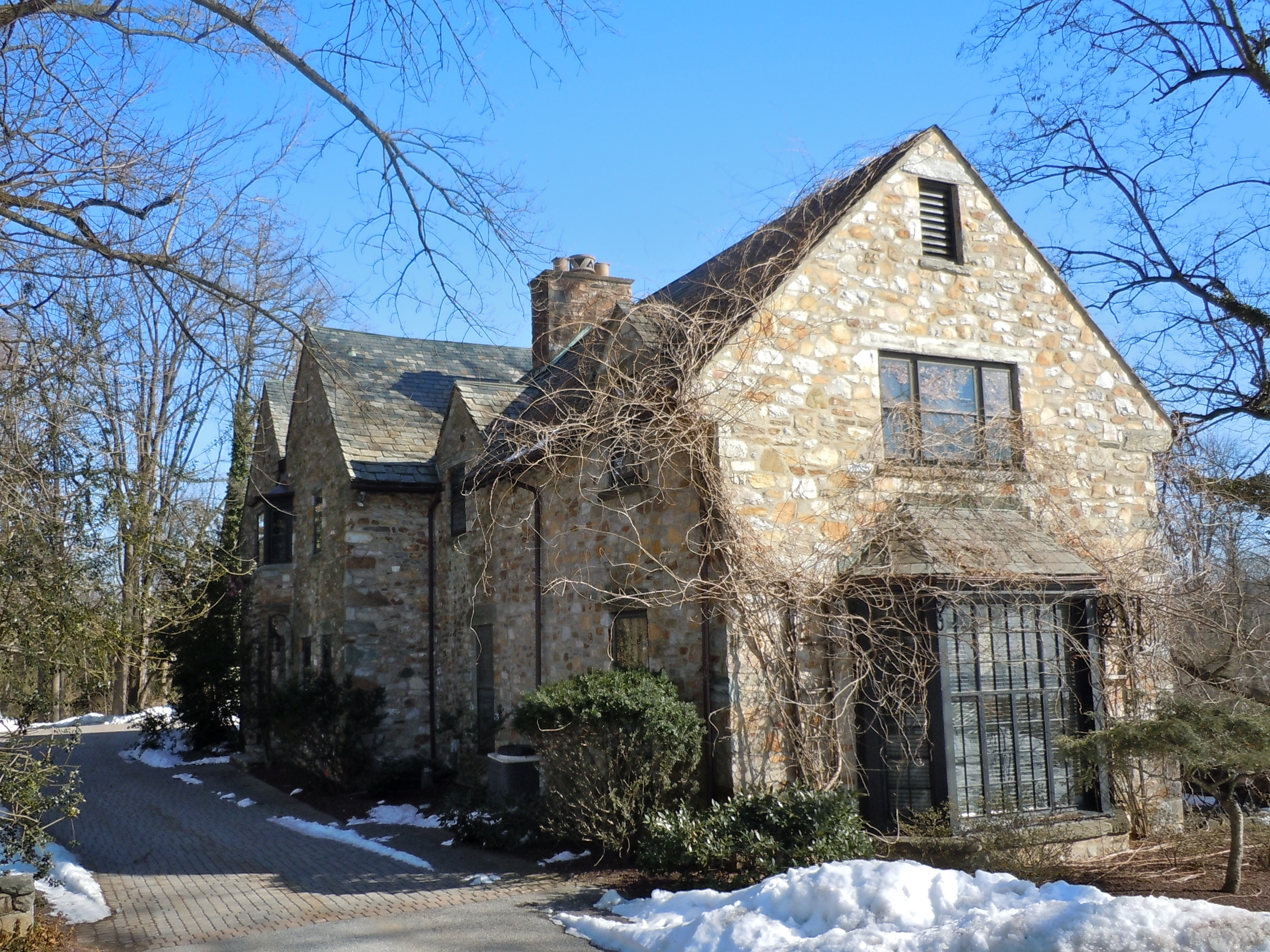
- Grimmet, February 2011

- Location within Pennsylvania Location within the United States
- Location: 620 W. Lincoln Hwy., West Whiteland Township, Pennsylvania
- Coordinates: 40°1′13″N 75°39′45″W
- Area: 6.9 acres (2.8 ha)
- Built: 1924, 1952
- Architect: McIlvaine, John Gilbert
- Architectural style: Renaissance, Late 19th And 20th Century Revivals
- NRHP reference No.: 96000099
- Added to NRHP: February 16, 1996

The Martha and Maurice Ostheimer Estate is an historic home that is located in West Whiteland Township, Chester County, Pennsylvania, United States. The estate home known as "Grimmet" was designed by architect John Gilbert McIlvaine, a partner of Wilson Eyre, and built in 1924 in the Tudor Revival style.

It was listed on the National Register of Historic Places in 1995.

== History and architectural features ==
Expanded in 1952, the estate house has been converted to office use. The property includes the previously-listed Wee Grimmet, which was built circa 1820 and expanded circa 1929 by McIlvaine. The property also includes a contributing small stone arch bridge, a terraced landscape, and the site of a nineteenth-century limestone quarry and kiln. Martha Gibson McIlvain Ostheimer was one of three founders of the Herb Society of America, and her Herb Gardens, west and southwest of Grimmet, were well known among herbalists until 1962.
