= Hobble skirt =

Type of skirt with a narrow hem

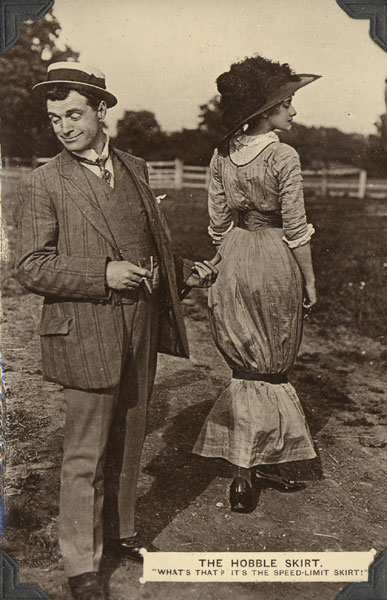
A postcard (c. 1911) depicting a man pointing at a woman wearing a hobble skirt. The caption says, "The Hobble Skirt. 'What's that? It's the speed-limit skirt!'", because a hobble skirt limits the wearer's stride.

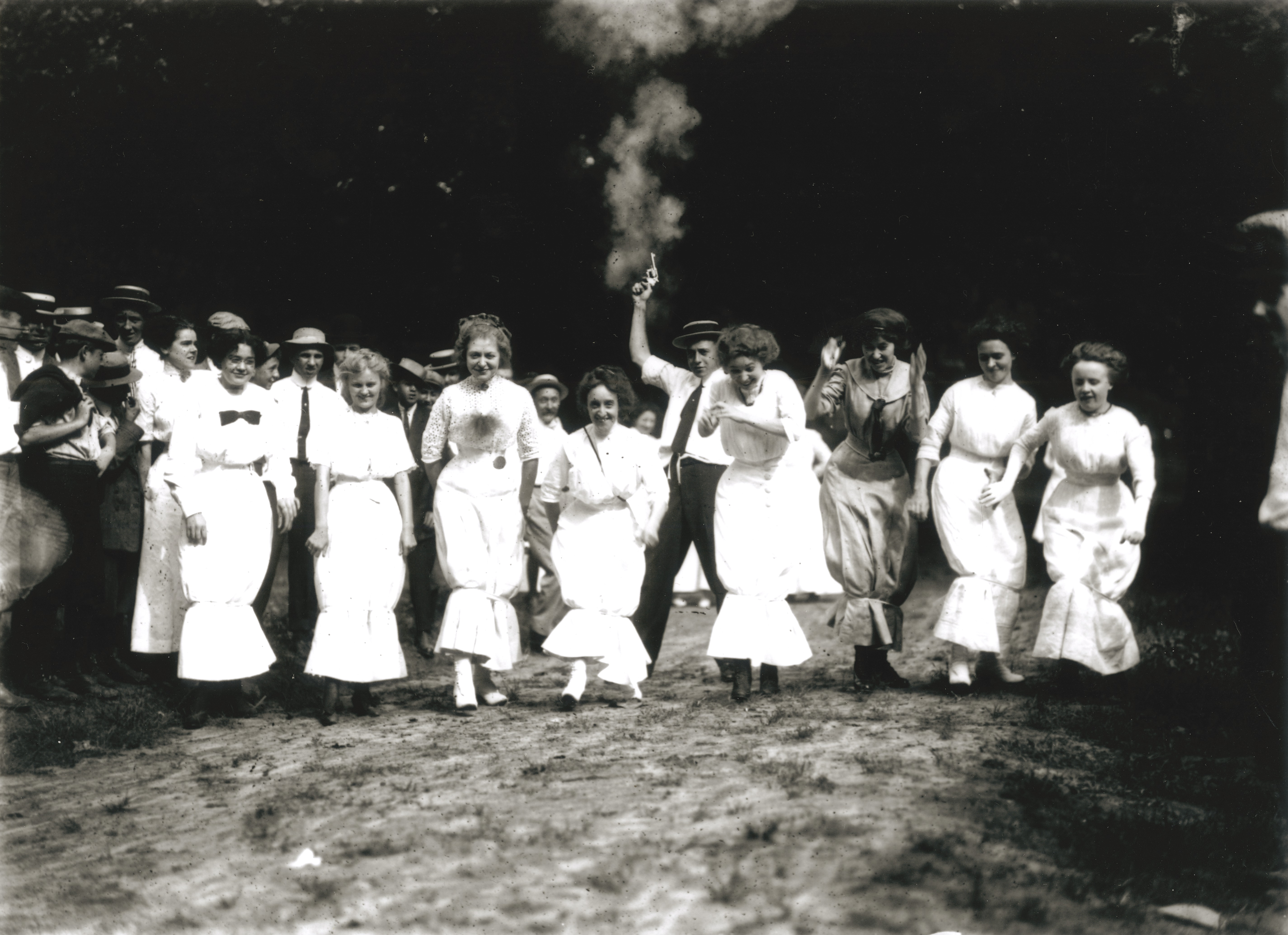
Eight women participate in a hobble skirt race.

A hobble skirt was a skirt with a narrow enough hem to significantly impede the wearer's stride. It was called a "hobble skirt" because it hobbled the woman as she walked. Hobble skirts were a short-lived fashion trend that peaked between 1908 and 1914.

== History ==
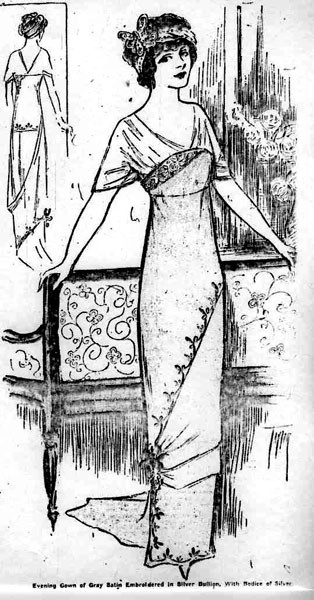
Hobble skirt style, 1911

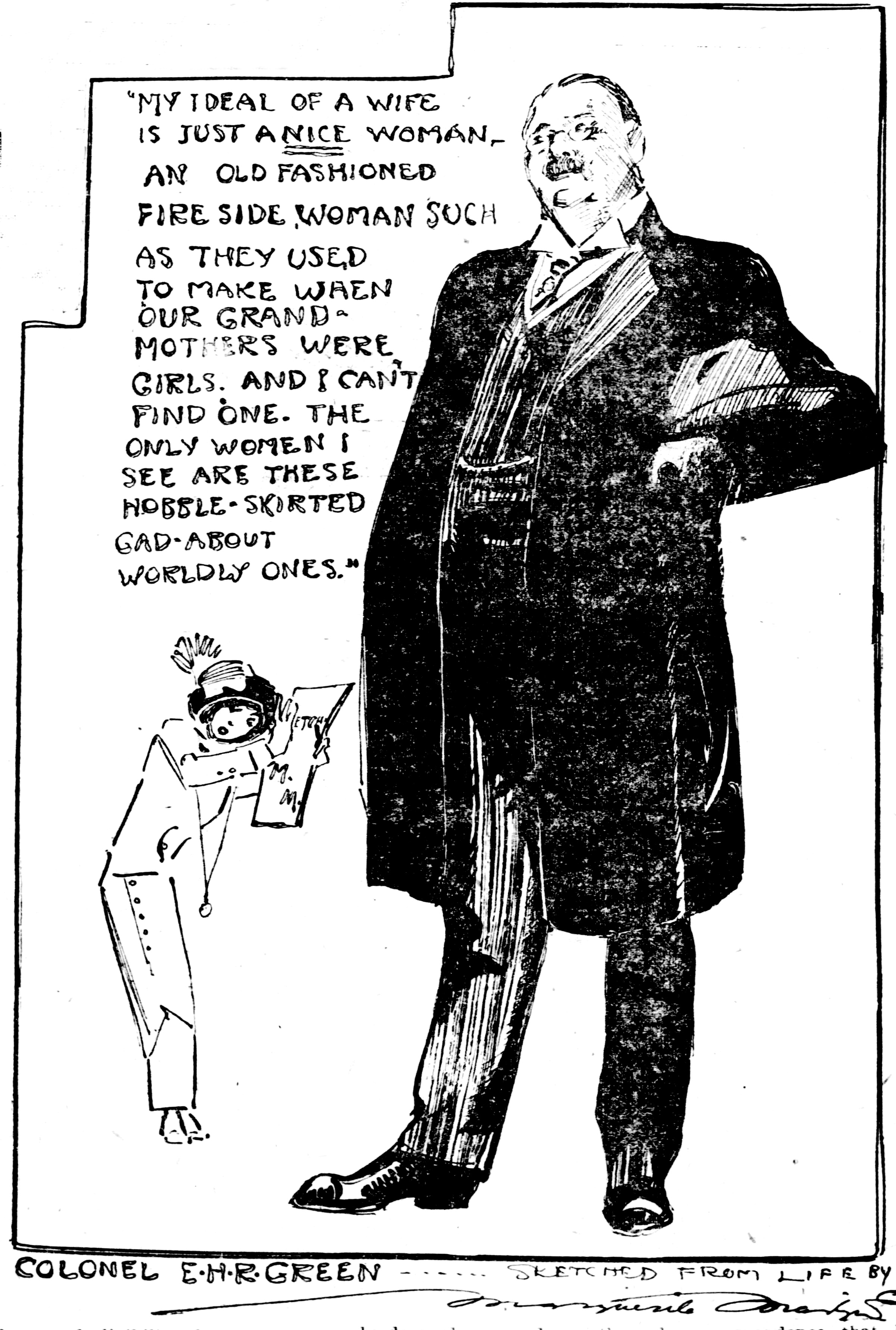
Journalist Marguerite Martyn drew this sketch of herself wearing a hobble skirt while interviewing millionaire Edward Howland Robinson Green in 1911, with a quotation from him.

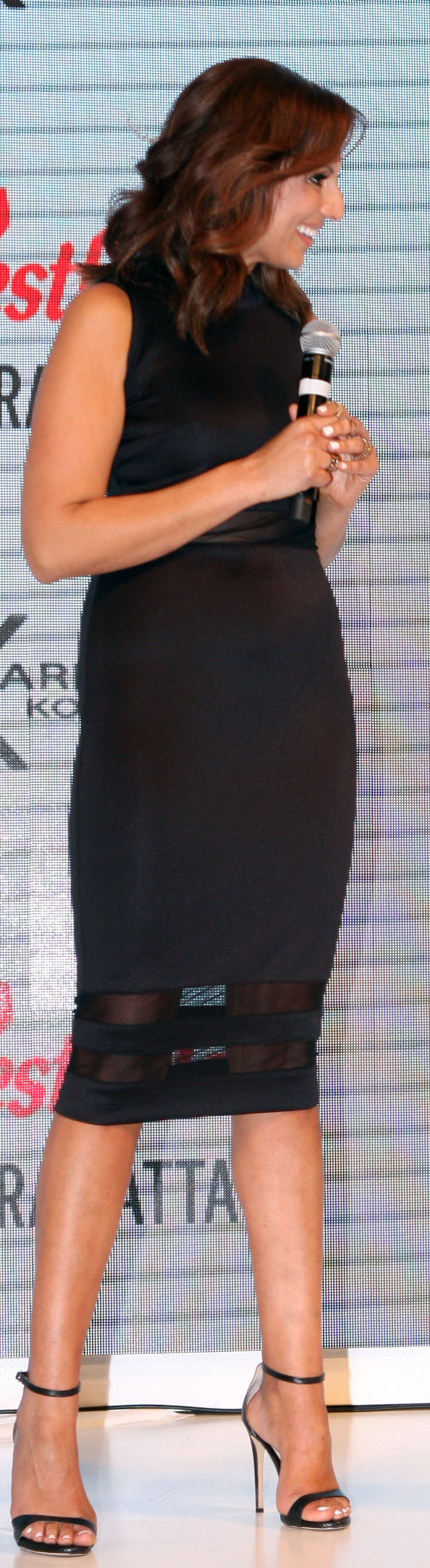
Long pencil skirts considered as a modern variation of the old hobble style

The hobble skirt may have been inspired by one of the first women to fly in an airplane. At a 1908 Wright Brothers demonstration in Le Mans, France, Mrs. Edith Ogilby Berg asked for a ride and became the first American woman to fly as a passenger in an airplane, soaring for two minutes and seven seconds. She tied a rope securely around her skirt at her ankles to keep it from blowing in the wind during the flight. According to the Smithsonian Air and Space Museum, a French fashion designer was inspired by the way Mrs. Berg walked away from the aircraft with her skirt still tied and created the hobble skirt based on her ingenuity.

The French fashion designer in the Berg story might have been Paul Poiret, who claimed credit for the hobble skirt, but it is not clear whether the skirt was his invention or not. Skirts had been rapidly narrowing since the mid-1900s. Slim skirts were economical because they used less fabric.

The hobble skirt became popular just as women were becoming more physically active.

Hobble skirts inspired hundreds of cartoons and comic postcards. One series of comic cards called it the "speed-limit skirt." There were several reports of women competing in hobble-skirt races as a joke.

Boarding a streetcar in a hobble skirt was difficult. In 1912, the New York Street Railway ran hobble-skirt cars with no step up. Los Angeles introduced similar streetcars in 1913.

Hobble skirts were directly responsible for several deaths. In 1910, a hobble-skirt-wearing woman was killed by a loose horse at a racetrack outside Paris. A year later, eighteen-year-old Ida Goyette stumbled on an Erie Canal bridge while wearing a hobble skirt, fell over the railing, and drowned.

To prevent women from splitting their skirts, some women wore a fetter or tied their legs together at the knee. Some designers made alterations to the hobble skirt to allow for greater movement. Jeanne Paquin concealed pleats in her hobble skirts while other designers such as Lucile offered slit or wrap skirts.

The trend began to decline in popularity at the beginning of World War I, as the skirt's limited mobility did not suit the wartime atmosphere.

== The post-hobble skirt era ==
The next time skirts were narrow enough to impede movement was with the sheath skirts of the 1950s, first introduced at the end of the 1940s. Though shorter lengths (from just below the knee to the lower calf) and advances in fabric would enable a little more movement than in the hobble-skirt era, the 1950s sheath skirt's new waist-to-hem tightness, said to reveal the shape of the leg, still created problems of mobility, with split seams a familiar occurrence. Nonetheless, they were widely promoted by designers and the fashion industry, their narrowness exaggerated even more by having models pose with one leg directly in front of the other. Despite being very different in shape from the original hobble skirts, 1950s sheath skirts were still occasionally referred to as hobble skirts. Some other skirt styles of the time also had very narrow hems, from trumpet skirts to the knee-length puffball/pouf skirts shown by Pierre Cardin, Yves Saint Laurent, Simonetta, and others from 1957 to 1960. Several of Saint Laurent's Fall 1959 skirts were so narrow at the hem, with some of the evening dresses so 1910-looking, that fashion writers immortalized the line as Saint Laurent's hobble skirt collection. Sheath skirts remained part of the fashion picture into the early 1960s and then went very much out of style with the rise of the flared miniskirts of the mid- to late sixties and the easy, comfortable clothes of the 1970s.

During the 1970s, only one designer consistently produced sheath-style skirts among his other skirt varieties and that was Pierre Cardin, who revived tight, knee- to ankle-length skirts in 1970 and continued to make them for at least half the decade. Fashion writers mostly ignored them, but those who did comment on them often used the word hobble to describe them. They did differ in one way from the sheath skirts of the 1950s in being unlined. Clothes in the fifties had been heavily constructed and worn with substantial undergarments. Fifties sheath skirts were not only lined but worn with girdles to both maintain the skirt's line and prevent the sight of jiggling flesh and unsightly dimples and crevices. Cardin's 1970s sheath skirts were unlined, thin of fabric, and worn only with pantyhose, and fashion writers sometimes commented on the visible panty lines on the models who wore them. These skirts were so out of step with public preference at the time that they were confined to Cardin's runways.

Toward the end of the 1970s, beginning in fall of 1978, more designers began reviving the narrow skirt silhouettes of decades past, usually lined. Initially, many of them allowed some movement via slits, though not always. Some were so inhibiting that the word hobble was once again used to describe them. When the tight silhouette of the 1950s sheath skirt was revived in the early 1980s, it was somewhat less restricting, as it was now usually produced in stretchier, often knit fabrics and could even be in mini lengths, as there is only so much movement possible in a knee-length or longer skirt that is tight all the way to the hem. This time, many of them were unlined, particularly those by Azzedine Alaïa, who was famous for his figure-hugging styles so tight that writers joked that there was barely any room for undergarments. 1980s-style stretch sheath skirts in various lengths have been revived off and on ever since.

== See also ==
- Corset controversy
- Fetish fashion
- Foot binding
- Gothic fashion
- Pencil skirt
