= Lily Post =

American actress and operatic soprano

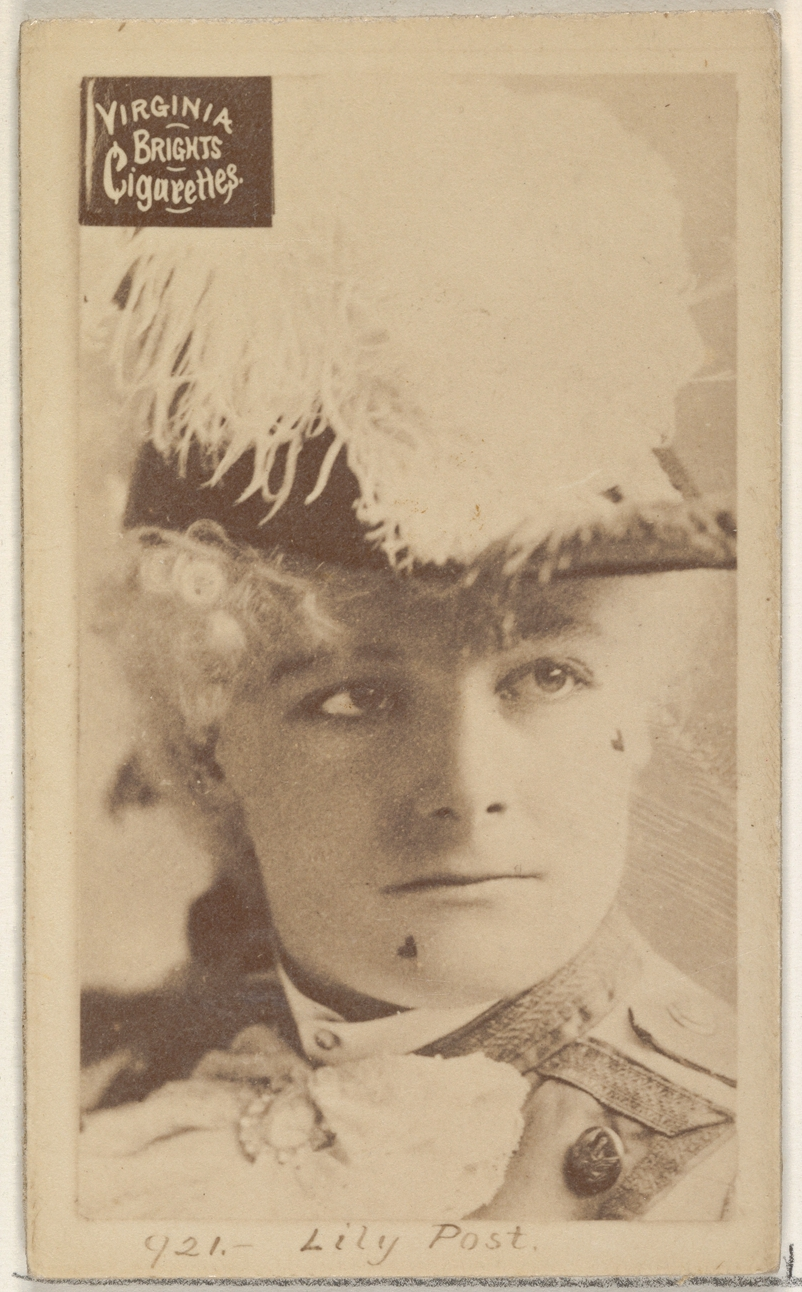
- Lily Post, ca. 1888
- Born: August 23, 1856
- Died: April 4, 1899 (aged 42); San Francisco, California
- Resting place: Cypress Lawn Memorial Park San Mateo County, California (Colma)
- Other names: Lily P. Post; Lilly Blair; Lilly Post
- Occupations: actress, singer
- Years active: 1880s-90s
- Spouse: Frank Blair
- Children: son

Lily Post (1856-1899) was an American actress and operatic soprano in the 1880s and 1890s. She appeared on stage with Marie Jansen, Fanny Rice, and Mathilde Cottrelly. She sang music by Edward Solomon and Signor Perugini, two men who had been married to Lillian Russell. In 1893 she introduced a pop piece called Momma's Love Song.

In January 1890 Post was granted a divorce from performer Frank Blair. They had one child and the issue of child support became a factor as Blair did not want to pay support as Post was rich from her theatrical earnings. In 1889 Post reportedly married Will H. Morton, a Chicago theater manager and they remained married until his death in 1895. He entered an insane asylum then died from paresis, a common symptom of syphilis.

Like her husband she entered a sanitarium or insane asylum on April 3, 1899, in San Francisco, having been admitted there by her son. She had been called demented in the press of the day. She died April 4, 1899, having been stricken with a heart attack, sometimes a complication of syphilis.

== Some works ==
- The Queen's Lace Handkerchief (1882–83)
- The Black Hussar (1885)
- Bluebeard Jr. (1889)
