= David Ogilby (East India Company officer) =

Irish-born soldier

Sir David Ogilby (?1755-1834) was an Irish-born officer in the East India Company's Madras Army who was knighted for his service in the Anglo-Mysore Wars.

== Birth and early life ==
He was among the numerous children of Alexander Ogilby, "an eminent bleacher and linendraper" of Limavady, County Londonderry, and his wife Mary (born Alexander). His father had captained a militia company in the 1750s, but otherwise there was no prior military tradition in his family.

Like much else concerning David Ogilby, his date of birth cannot be stated with certainty. An early source, closely identified with Ogilby himself, states that he was born on 3 August 1755 and served with the Irish Volunteers from the age of 14 or 15. These two details are difficult to reconcile because the Limavady Battalion of the Volunteers was not formed until 7 November 1777, but a birthdate of 1755 is supported by Ogilby's reported age of 78 at death in 1834. Another source, consciously contradicting the first, gives his date of birth as 3 August 1767, (Note: The author of The East India Military Calendar (see Reference 5) acknowledged his indebtedness to Some Striking Particulars (see Reference 3), repeating much of its content verbatim.) but he had definitely been born by 6 March 1766 when named in a lease of lands at Ballyhenry, County Londonderry.

In about 1780 he obtained an East India Company cadetship and, having attended Lewis Lochee's military academy in Little Chelsea, he embarked for India early in 1782. Within a fortnight of his arrival at Madras he was, through the influence of Paul Benfield, commissioned ensign in a Native Infantry corps in the southern army. (Note: Some Striking Particulars stated Ogilby's appointment was made by Earl Macartney following "interference by a friend"; the friend was identified as Benfield in The East Indian Military Calendar.)

== Military service 1782–1802 ==
He first saw action (Note: Except where otherwise indicated, the material contained under this head is sourced from Some Striking Particulars and The East Indian Military Calendar. The latter relied substantially on the former, while the former stated its content was "communicated by a friend with whom the subject maintained a regular correspondence". Some Striking Particulars was reprinted in full in the Madras Government Gazette of 13 September 1804, prefaced by comment from "An Admirer of Modest Merit" lamenting the lack of objectivity in "its partial effusions now acknowledged as the genuine productions of the gallant Knight of Limavady". The East India Military Calendar text was fully reproduced in the Naval and Military Gazette of 6 September 1834 (pp. 11-12) as an obituary tribute to Ogilby. In summary, the majority of the content of the several published accounts of his military career to 1802 therefore has but a single originator, probably Ogilby himself. The information supplied here should be read in that light.) in the attacks on Tipu Sultan's garrisons at Panchalankurichi, Sivagiri and Palakkad Fort in the latter part of 1783. In the first of these engagements the British force withdrew after "considerable slaughter on both sides" and Ogilby and his men were left to cover the retreat and bring off the wounded.

In the same year he had temporary command of his battalion when, on picket duty at Coimbatore, it successfully resisted an attack by a large body of Tipu's cavalry, and he was jointly responsible for moving some 20,000 cattle and sheep to supply the army assembled at Dharapuram. When later engaged on a similar movement of stock with a small detachment of sepoys, he had to beat a 15-mile retreat over the open plains of Dharapuram under repeated attack by a mounted force of 400. The Second Mysore War ended shortly afterwards.

Having successfully applied for appointment to the 1st Madras European Regiment, he was soon given command of a company on the general staff of the army. He was later promoted lieutenant and, following outbreak of the Third Mysore War and the capture of Dharapuram in 1790, had command of the native troop detachments forming part of the garrison there.

Returning to field service in command of a grenadier company, he distinguished himself by his valour at the taking of the important stronghold of Dindigul in July 1790 and was appointed Fort Adjutant. (Note: Of the attack on Dindigul, James George Smith Neill's Historical Record of The Honourable East India Company's First Madras European Regiment states "The grenadiers of the 1st battalion, under Captain Bowser and Lieutenant Ogilby, led the storm... The assault was continued for some time with the most determined gallantry, but with no avail; the enemy, however, became alarmed, and surrendered at discretion shortly afterwards... Lieutenant Ogilby was appointed Fort-Adjutant for his gallant service on the occasion". This differs from the accounts given in Some Striking Particulars and The East India Military Calendar, which assert that Ogilby's attack on the lower fort overcame all opposition in the space of fifteen minutes, enabling him to participate in successful storming of the upper fort.) He remained in that post until 1796, strengthening the allegiance of several Polygar leaders to the East India Company and bringing the extensive and fertile valley of Dindigul under control by obtaining surrender of the fortress of Uthamapalayam, for which achievement he received special thanks from Government. The surrender of Uthamapalayam was accomplished after he took hostage two Polygar chiefs who professed loyalty to the Company but exposed their treachery when conversing in the Tamil language in Ogilby's presence, not realising he was proficient in their tongue.

From 1796 to 1800 he had command of the garrison at Namakkal, with responsibility for holding in check the strong outpost of Karur. He later claimed that, prior to the outbreak of the Fourth Mysore War, he submitted to Lord Clive plans for the surprise and reduction of the forts of Karur, Erode, Dharapuram, Coimbatore and Calumbaum, pledging to take Karur at the head of half his garrison or die in the attempt; the submission was said to have utilised intelligence he obtained by entering Karur in disguise, and to have been favourably received but not adopted because of the need to maintain supplies from the relevant districts for the grand army at Seringapatam.

In 1796 he was, with other lieutenants in the East India Company service (HEICS), given the brevet rank of captain in His Majesty's army and in 1798 he was promoted captain-lieutenant in the HEICS. Few European constitutions were considered equal to twenty years' service in the Indian climate, and in 1800 Ogilby was at Madras and about to go on furlough due to deteriorating health when he learned that his corps was among those General Wellesley had assembled at Chitradurga to suppress the insurgency of Dhondia Wagh. He immediately travelled 600 miles inland to take part in the defeat of Wagh's forces. He eventually left India on furlough in 1802, sailing from Bombay for America on 22 May.

== America, knighthood and marriage ==
In 1798 Ogilby had buried his companion Ann Campbell in the cemetery at Tiruchirappalli where he had previously laid their four children to rest. In 1802 he met, at Boston, Massachusetts, Mary Tyler Cooke, the orphaned nineteen-year-old niece of judge and playwright Royall Tyler, and in early winter the pair sailed for Liverpool, claiming to have married. (Note: Mary Cooke claimed to have been married at her aunt's house in Vermont; her aunt, Mary Palmer Tyler (author of The Maternal Physician, 1811), denied this and also reported the couple's refusal to marry in Boston: Grandmother Tyler's Book, The Recollections of Mary Palmer Tyler 1775-1866, G. P. Putnam's Sons, New York, 1925, p. 310.) They were at Limavady by 1804 when Mary gave birth to a daughter who died in May.

On 29 January 1804 Ogilby was dubbed a knight bachelor at Dublin Castle by the Earl of Hardwicke, the Lord Lieutenant of Ireland, a Dublin newspaper reporting "The reputation of this deserving officer had prepared Lord Hardwicke to estimate his character, and his excellency was pleased, publicly, to confer upon him the honour of knighthood, in consideration of a series of zealous and meritorious services to his country, during the long and arduous period of twenty-two years in the East Indies". The knighthood was one of only three bestowed by Hardwicke during his time as Lord Lieutenant, 1801-1806; his selections appear idiosyncratic. (Note: The other knights bachelor created by Hardwicke were John Ferns (1801), a wine merchant and gifted amateur singer who was one of the Sheriffs of Dublin, and John Andrew Stevenson (1803), vicar choral at Christ Church Cathedral, Dublin: William A. Shaw and G. D. Burtchaell, The Knights of England. A Complete Record from the Earliest Time to the Present-Day of the Knights of all the Orders of Chivalry in England, Scotland and Ireland, and of Knights Bachelors, incorporating A Complete List of Knights Bachelor Dubbed in Ireland, Vol. II, Sherratt & Hughes, London, 1906, pp. 306-308.)

Ogilby's accolade was promptly followed by publication of a congratulatory account of his military service in Walker's Hibernian Magazine. This was reproduced in the Madras-based Government Gazette, prefaced by remarks critical of its objectivity.

Accompanied by "Lady Ogilby", he proceeded to London and in October was promoted Major, 9th Native Infantry, in succession to James Achilles Kirkpatrick. In the following year the couple's "beautiful new chariot, built purposefully for India" was damaged outside the Opera House in Covent Garden, and in 1806 they were based in Norfolk Street, Grosvenor Square, and preparing to depart for Madras. In April The Lady's Monthly Museum published "A Biographical Sketch of Lady Ogilby" which included a highly coloured account of Ogilby's courtship of her and extolled her beauty, benevolence, refinement, elegance and literary talent in terms such that her aunt assumed the piece was self-written.

The Lady's Monthly sketch recalled that, during Ogilby's time in America, he "traversed a considerable tract of the interior" and rewarded the hospitality of those whom he met by presenting them with seeds he had collected from Tahiti, India and Mauritius and instructing them in the appropriate methods of cultivation. (Note: Since Ogilby did not depart Bombay until late May 1802, it is unlikely that he arrived in North America before September. The recollections of Mary Cooke's aunt point to Ogilby sailing for England in late October or early November, so his opportunity for travel would have been limited.)

On 27 May 1806 Ogilby and Mary Tyler Cook (described as spinster, of Portsea, Hampshire, and Roxbury, Massachusetts) were married at St Mary's Parish Church, Portsea, by Bishop's Licence. Their infant son and daughter had been baptised in a Unitarian chapel at Portsmouth on the previous day. (Note: The baptisms or dedications were performed by the Unitarian minister, Rev. Russell Scott, who witnessed the parents' wedding on the following day.) A fortnight later the family sailed for India on the Lord Eldon, arriving at Calcutta in November.

== Military service 1807–1809 ==
Ogilby rejoined the 9th Native Infantry at Fort St George in March 1807 and was promoted Lieutenant-Colonel in May 1808. He commanded the regiment's 1st Battalion and was next senior officer to Major-General Robert Croker who had charge of the Ceded District of Bellary. Ogilby's return to India coincided with an upsurge of discontent among officers of the Madras Army due to reduction of their financial benefits. By July 1809 a major failure of military discipline gripped southern India, with many officers treating their troops as their own private armies. To isolate the most mutinous element, all officers were called on to pledge that they would act in support of the government.

Ogilby signed the pledge but added he did so "to show I am conscientiously of opinion that the support of Government in this country is necessary to the general welfare of the empire; in every other sense it is from me a fruitless declaration". He had, shortly beforehand, written to the Commander in Chief requesting permission to take retirement because "a long declining state of health and recent severe mental affliction" had rendered him "entirely unable to conduct the duties of a station of so much responsibility". The mental affliction to which he referred was the death of Lady Ogilby in June.

Having regarded Ogilby as the only field officer to whom he could look for support in dealing with the difficult circumstances that beset his command, Major-General Croker placed on record his disappointment with Ogilby's failure to exert influence over junior ranks. In Croker's opinion, neither Ogilby's ill health nor his bereavement excused this. On 9 August Governor Sir George Barlow expressed concern at "how little assistance" Ogilby had provided "on so trying an occasion". (Note: All but three of the officers at Bellary refused to sign the declaration: Lt Col W. J. Wilson, History of The Madras Army, Vol. 3, Madras, 1882, p. 281.)

Authority for Ogilby's retirement on full pay was confirmed in October, but he had left his post four days after Barlow's expression of concern. With him he took his three children (one born in India) and his wife’s remains. (Note: The remains were "so especially preserved by a medical envelopement performed by Dr. M'Caskell that after a lapse of five years it appeared as though her death had taken place only a few days": East India Military Calendar, pp. 298-299.)

== Later years ==
In May 1814 he remarried at St Clement Danes, his bride being Elizabeth Dunkin (otherwise Duncan). Five months later "the elegant Lady Ogilby" was reported to have bought "all the principal splendid ornaments of Her Royal Highness the Princess of Wales's two drawing-rooms at the sale at Connaught House" which followed the Princess vacating the property and removing to Italy.

Following the coronation of George IV, Ogilby was presented to the King by Lord Howden (former Commander-in-Chief of the Madras Army) and he was afterwards several times in attendance at Court. When Lady Ogilby accompanied him at St James's Palace in May 1824, a newspaper report of her attire (which included a headdress comprising "a profusion of diamonds and ostrich feathers") occupied ten lines of print. In 1823 the couple sued Mr and Mrs John Channon for defamation, alleging that Mrs Channon had falsely disparaged them in retaliation for Lady Ogilby refusing to introduce her at the Royal Drawing Room in April 1822. The case (which the Ogilbys' counsel opened by referring to Sir David as a "gentleman of rank who has acquired a high reputation by his public services") relied upon letters said to be in Mrs Channon's hand, but the jury was not satisfied she had written them and the Ogilbys' case was lost.

In 1820 Ogilby and his cousin, William Law Ogilby, had entered into partnership as merchants, agents and shipbrokers in the Irish provisions trade, carrying on business from Ingram Court, Fenchurch Street. (Note: His involvement in maritime business was recognised by the naming of the Sir David Ogilby, variously classed as a brig or schooner, which first sailed in 1823: Gore's Liverpool Daily Advertiser, 18 December 1823. The vessel was active in European and Atlantic trade and, later, in the South Seas (her captain and several crew being killed by Fijian islanders in 1838); she was wrecked near Newcastle, New South Wales, in September 1840: Sydney Gazette and New South Wales Advertiser, 14 June 1838; Sydney Herald, 23 September 1840.) The partnership was declared bankrupt in 1826. Despite this financial setback, Sir David Ogilby was able to remain active in fashionable social circles. He was presented to William IV in October 1830 and took a cottage at Brighton in anticipation of the King's arrival there in 1832.

== Death and family members ==
On 9 August 1834, as he returned to his house, Fromer Lodge at Friern Barnet, after dining with his sister, his four-wheeled chaise (drawn by a single blind horse) overturned into a ditch, trapping him underneath. His body was removed to The Bull at Whetstone where life was pronounced extinct. He died intestate, and his personal effects were valued at no more than £50 when administration of his estate was granted.

His widow lived latterly at Brandenburg Lodge, Fulham, where she died in 1854. (Note: The name Brandenburg Lodge suggests the property was associated with the demolished Brandenburg House, where Queen Caroline had died in 1821.) Of her several children by Ogilby, David Fitzroy Ogilby (1815-71) was commissioned in the 6th Foot and presented at Court in 1839, served in Canada, and retired in the rank of captain in 1848, becoming a cotton waste dealer in Manchester. The son of Ogilby's first marriage, Augustus Beaufort Ogilby (1804-34), served with the 27th Bengal Native Infantry and was Acting Quartermaster and Interpreter at Hansi when he died a few weeks before his father. Ogilby's sixteen-year-old daughter Isabel Georgina also predeceased her father by a matter of weeks.

Among the several husbands of Sir David's actress granddaughter, Edith Alice Ogilby, was Hart O. Berg (married 1906; divorced 1922). Berg acted as business manager for the Wright Brothers and on 7 October 1908 his wife was Wilbur Wright's passenger in a two-minute flight at Auvours, near Le Mans, thus becoming the first American woman to fly in a fixed-wing aircraft. The manner in which she tied the hem of her dress on that occasion is said to have influenced the design of the hobble skirt.

== Poetry ==
According to the account published in Walker's Hibernian Magazine of 1804, Ogilby "produced many beautiful little pieces of lyric poetry both original and translations from the Tamul or Malabar languages". An example, "Elma. An Hindoo Lyric Poem translated from the original by Sir David Ogilby which first appeared in the Madras Courier", was printed in the magazine with explanatory footnotes. It seems to have been on the strength of his appearance in Walker's that D. J. O'Donoghue included an entry for Ogilby (whom he described "as a soldier of great distinction in India") in The Poets of Ireland: a Biographical and Bibliographical Dictionary of Irish Writers of English Verse. No other example of verse attributed to Ogilby has found its way into print in Britain.

== Portraits ==
The biographical notice that appeared in Walker's Hibernian Magazine was accompanied by "An Elegant and Animated Portrait" of Ogilby. A portrait of his first wife, taken from a miniature by James Barry, engraved by Edward Scriven and published by Vernor, Hood & Sharpe, was included in The Lady's Monthly Museum’s tribute to her. A later portrait of Ogilby, by William Egley, was exhibited at the Royal Academy in 1824.
