= Ogilby =

Ogilby is a surname. Notable people with the surname include:

- Anne Ogilby (c. 1943 – 1974), Northern Irish murder victim; killed by the Ulster Defence Association in a punishment beating
- David Ogilby (disambiguation)
- John Ogilby (1600–1676), Scottish translator, impresario and cartographer
- William Ogilby (1805–1873), Irish barrister and naturalist
- James Douglas Ogilby (1853–1925), Australian zoologist, son of William Ogilby
- Robert Ogilby (1880–1964), soldier

== See also ==
- Ogilby, California, small town in the United States
