= Robert Ogilby =

Anglo-Irish army officer

Colonel Robert James Leslie Ogilby, DSO, DL (1880–1964), was a senior British Army officer who commanded a battalion of the London Scottish Regiment in the First World War and was later the regiment's Honorary Colonel. He founded and first endowed the British Army Museums Ogilby Trust in 1954.

== Birth and early life ==
Robert Ogilby was born at 15 Victoria Road, Kensington Gardens, London, on 27 November 1880, and was the only son among the seven children of Robert and Helen Ogilby. His father was an officer in the King's Own Royal Regiment, 1870–82, and served in the Anglo-Zulu War. His mother was a daughter of the Rev. George Bomford Wheeler, classicist and translator, who edited The Irish Times between 1859 and 1877.

Ogilby was educated at Eton College. On leaving, in 1898, he was commissioned into the 4th (Cambridge Militia) Battalion, Suffolk Regiment and in 1900 he transferred to regular service with the 4th (Royal Irish) Dragoon Guards, proceeding to India shortly afterwards. While in India he became accomplished at polo and he played the sport for his regiment both there and, after joining the 2nd Life Guards in 1903, at the Ranelagh and Roehampton Clubs. He sold his ponies on retiring from the Life Guards in 1905, but resumed playing as captain of The Parthians in the following year.

On the death of his father in 1902 he inherited lands in County Londonderry and at Woolwich. His Woolwich estate, based on Powis Street, included commercial properties that had been redeveloped under his father's initiative at the turn of the century and generated an important revenue stream. His Irish holdings comprised the 300-acre Pellipar and the smaller Ardnargle and Dungiven Castle estates.

In the years prior to 1907 he enlarged Pellipar House to become one of the most architecturally distinctive mansions in the county, and it provided the base for his farming and public service activities. He established a prize-winning herd of shorthorn cattle (Note: According to Irish Farming World in 1913 "No one has given a greater fillip to the breeding of shorthorns in Ulster than Mr R. J. L. Ogilby... his sire Count Crystal is undoubtedly the most valuable stock bull our country possesses": quoted in Londonderry Sentinel, 18 September 1913, p. 6. In 1915 he paid 1,400 guineas for the bull Edgcote Regalia; one of its progeny, Pellipar John, sold to an Argentinian purchaser for more than £5,500: Perthshire Advertiser, 3 November 1915, p. 7, and 21 June 1933, p. 20.) and sat on the Council of the Royal Ulster Agricultural Society. He was appointed a magistrate in 1907 and a Deputy Lieutenant of County Londonderry in 1908, and served as the county's High Sheriff in 1911.

== Military service 1914–1919 ==
Having joined the General Reserve of Officers immediately following Britain's declaration of war against Germany, he was appointed a temporary Captain in his old regiment, the Irish Dragoons, in February 1915. By May 1916 he had been promoted Major and was second-in-command of the 7th Battalion of the Norfolk Regiment when engaged in heavy fighting during the Battle of the Somme. He was advanced to Lieutenant-Colonel in the same year and in September was given command of the 2nd/14th London Regiment, the London Scottish. (Note: In 1955 Ogilby recalled that Earl Haig had personally requested him to assume command of the battalion: Belfast News-Letter, 21 February 1955, p. 5. Haig was later (1919–26) Honorary Colonel of the London Scottish.) In November he led this Territorial battalion, part of the 60th Division, to reinforce the allied army on the Salonica front.

The battalion saw action during the Second Battle of Doiran, and Ogilby was mentioned for gallantry in General Milne's half-yearly despatches of March and October 1917. By the latter date he had already spent three months with his unit in Egypt and Palestine; (Note: Ogilby privately commissioned (from J. R. Gaunt & Son) a regimental badge to be worn by his battalion in their foreign-service helmets while in Egypt and Palestine: John Gaylor, Military Badge Collecting, 7th Edition, Leo Cooper, Barnsley, 2003, Chapter 9, Plate 37.) he was mentioned for his service in the latter theatre in General Allenby's despatches of January 1918. He was awarded the Distinguished Service Order (DSO) in the same month.

As part of 60th Division, Ogilby's battalion saw considerable action in Palestine (where its soldiers accounted for two of the three Victoria Crosses won by men of the London Scottish) and made an important contribution to carrying the British line forward from Beersheba to Jerusalem. After the Battle of Jerusalem the battalion, headed by its pipes, was the first to enter the city as a formed body. (Note: The score of the tune played by the battalion's pipes on entering Jerusalem, 9 December 1917, was published in The Pipes of War, A Collection of Pipe Tunes, Maclehose Jackson & Co., Glasgow, 1920, and is there credited to Ogilby.) General Chetwode later recalled it was the first unit of XX Corps to regain parade smartness after shaking off the mud through which it had to fight during the final stage of the battle.

St Andrew's Church, Jerusalem was later built as a tribute to Scottish soldiers who fell in the Palestine campaign, and Ogilby was present when the memorial for the London Scottish casualties was unveiled there in 1934.

Leaving Palestine and returning to France in June 1918, Ogilby's battalion was in action during the Advance in Flanders as part of the 30th Division, contributing to the capture of the Dranoutre Ridge in August. For his "very fine work" in the latter operation Ogilby was mentioned in Field Marshal Haig's despatches and awarded a bar to his DSO. The award citation referred to the "particularly fine example of energy and fearlessness he set to his men at a critical time" and to the value of his personal reconnaissance which led to adjustment of his dispositions and enhanced ability to withstand counter-attack.

Ogilby's battalion was attempting to bridge the River Scheldt when the November Armistice was announced. He relinquished his command in January 1919 and was awarded the Belgian Croix de guerre in March. He retired from Territorial service in July, retaining his rank of lieutenant-colonel.

== Interwar period ==
In September 1920, against the background of the deteriorating political situation in Ireland, he purchased the 400-acre Moreton Hall estate in Warwickshire. He moved the Pellipar shorthorn herd to that property but sold the animals in the following year. He advertised his Ardnargle and Dungiven Castle holdings for sale in the early 1920s and found a purchaser for the latter. Pellipar House was on the market in 1927. (Note: The property was eventually sold by Ogilby in 1953. He sold his Woolwich estate in 1956.)

In November 1936 he married Isabel, the widow of the Rev. Charles Brocklebank of Westwood Park, West Bergholt. She died in October 1940, and he sold Moreton Hall and its contents in 1947.

== Honorary colonelcy ==
In September 1942 he was appointed Honorary Colonel of the London Scottish, holding the position jointly with the then Queen, who had been the regiment's Royal Honorary Colonel (otherwise styled Colonel-in-Chief) since 1935. To facilitate the appointment he was made an Honorary Colonel of both the Gordon Highlanders (of which the 1st and 2nd London Scottish had become part) and the Royal Artillery (of which the newly formed 3rd Battalion London Scottish constituted a regiment).

In the following year he established a benevolent fund to help men of the London Scottish who found themselves in difficulty after the war ended. In all areas of his life he was resolute in supporting those in genuine adversity or distress. General Carton de Wiart observed "He wastes no sympathy on you when you have no need of it but stands like the Rock of Gibraltar when you do".

Ogilby continued as Honorary Colonel of the London Scottish until 1955 and declined to be made a CBE in the Birthday Honours of that year.

== Heritage and museums ==
Ogilby's experience of military life convinced him that the fighting spirit of the British soldier was rooted in the Army's regimental system and that it was this "esprit de corps alone which held men together in tight corners". He believed regimental and corps museums were key to preserving the heritage and promoting the traditions that enriched the system and, having joined the Society for Army Historical Research in 1929, he was instrumental in establishing its Museum Committee in 1936. He had been elected to the Society's Council in 1932 and was its chairman from 1951 until 1960, when he became a vice-president.

In 1954 he gave £100,000 (Note: The amount of the gift was uniformly reported as £100,000 in contemporary press reports, but the Army Museums Ogilby Trust website has referred to the original trust being established "with a capital of £95,000".) to endow a trust which had as its objectives the encouragement, equipment and maintenance of existing regimental and army museums, as well as the fostering of interest in regimental and military tradition. His gift was announced by the War Office and, with the approval of the Army Council, the trust was named the Army Museums Ogilby Trust. He "steered the trust through its early days of official, if benign, War Office scepticism" and it came to play a significant part in the establishment and development of 136 regimental and corps museums in Britain.

He hoped other donations to the Trust might ultimately result in creation of a central National Army Museum to hold historic military objects and be run on similar lines to the National Maritime Museum, and at their second meeting, in November 1954, the Trustees resolved to support the principle of such creation. Among the Trustees was Sir Gerald Templer; it was in large measure his efforts coupled with the stimulus provided by his fellow Trustees that led to establishment of the National Army Museum in 1970.

== Death and further heritage endowment ==
Ogilby died on 27 January 1964. By his will he left bequests to the London Scottish Regiment and the residue of his estate to be held as the Robert Ogilby Trust for general charitable purposes analogous to those of the Army Museums Ogilby Trust. The two Trusts were amalgamated under the name of the latter in December 1993.

His bequests to his regiment included his uniform and medals, which are now on display in the London Scottish regimental museum at Horseferry Road drill hall.

The amount of his residual estate was some £90,000. If such comparisons are meaningful, application of the Bank of England's inflation calculator suggests Ogilby's cumulative endowment of the Museums Trust was equivalent to more than £4.5 million at 2020 value.

== Tennis and golf ==
With his purchase of the Moreton Hall estate, Ogilby acquired what was regarded by many as the world's finest real tennis court, constructed for Charles Tuller Garland in 1907. Ogilby was described as a "keen enthusiast" for real tennis and retained Edward Johnson as his professional at the court. The building is now home to Moreton Morrell Tennis Court Club, which holds competition for the Ogilby Cup as its first tournament of the year.

On leaving Moreton Hall, Ogilby bought a house in Kings Avenue, Sandwich, Kent, backing on to the course of the Royal St George's Golf Club. He spent his final years there and became Captain of Royal St George's. The Old Etonian Golfing Society holds its Summer Meeting at the club, and its members play annually for the society's Ogilby Cup.
