= Industrial Museum (London) =

The Industrial Museum (later the Industrial Health and Safety Centre or Safety, Health and Welfare Museum) was a museum at the junction of Horseferry Road and Elverton Street in the City of Westminster, London, run by the factory department of the Home Office. It was designed by the Office of Works and was due to open in 1914, but the outbreak of the First World War meant it was instead used for social and educational events by Australian troops, an Anti-Aircraft Signal Company and the Metropolitan Police until 1925.

It took until December 1927 for it to be re-opened as a museum, with a catalogue produced in 1934. The Factory Department and the Museum were transferred to the Ministry of Labour and National Service for the duration of the Second World War and by 1943 staffing shortages had forced the Museum to close for the duration. It hosted the 1951 Manpower Exhibition and on 22 March 1955 was renamed the Industrial Health and Safety Centre.

It closed in 1980 after a cost-benefit study by the Health and Safety Executive found that (in the words of the Secretary of State for Employment) "the cost per head for visitors was higher than for comparable methods of bringing relevant information to the public". Its building was demolished and in 1985 the drill hall of the London Scottish was built on the site.
