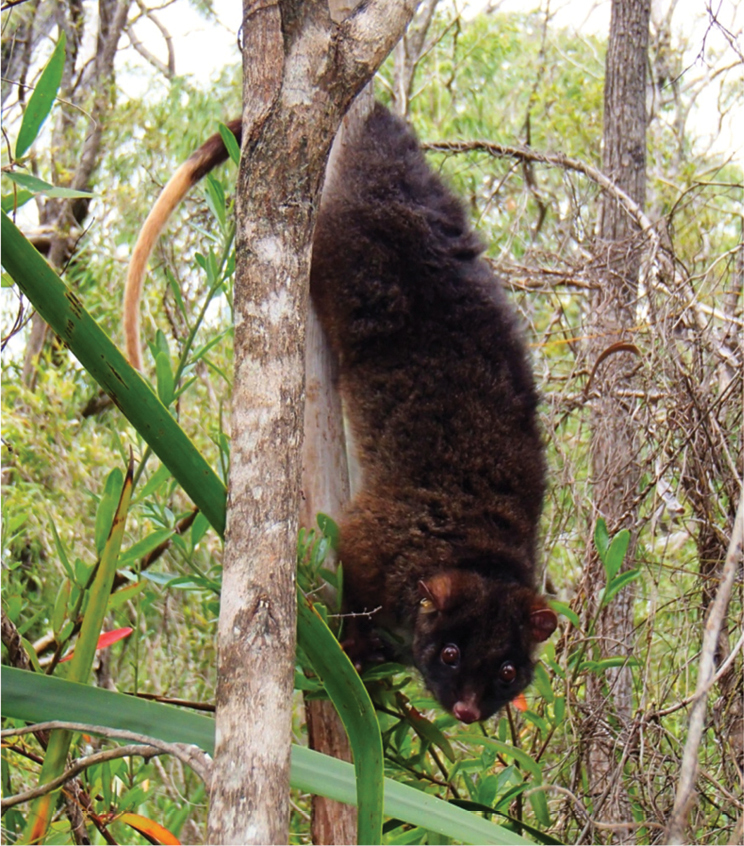

Conservation status
- Critically Endangered (IUCN 3.1)

Scientific classification
- Kingdom: Animalia
- Phylum: Chordata
- Class: Mammalia
- Infraclass: Marsupialia
- Order: Diprotodontia
- Family: Pseudocheiridae
- Genus: Pseudocheirus
- Species: P. occidentalis

Binomial name
- Pseudocheirus occidentalis (Thomas, 1888)
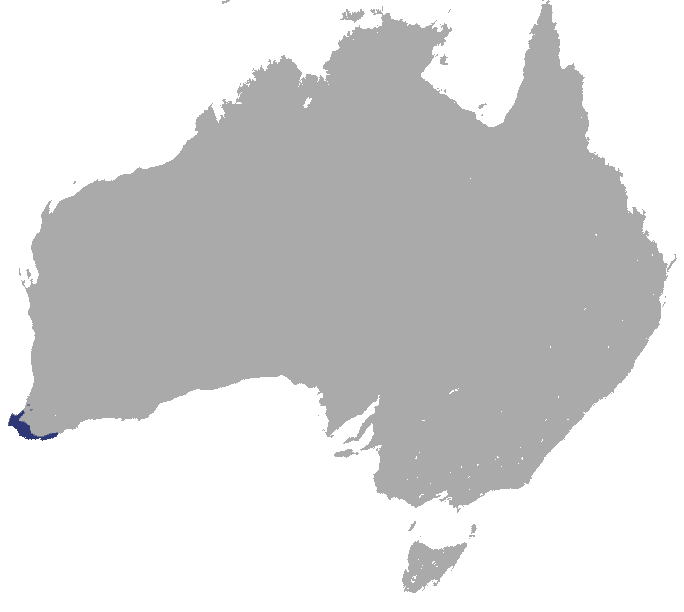
- Western Ringtail Possum range

Synonyms
- Pseudochirus occidentalis Thomas, 1888

= Western ringtail possum =

Species of possum found in Southwest Australia

The western ringtail possum or ngwayir (Pseudocheirus occidentalis) is a species of possum found in a small area of Southwest Australia. They are a cat-sized marsupial with a stocky build, dark greyish-brown fur, pale underparts and a long prehensile tail with a whitish tip. Ngwayir forage at night through the upper canopy of trees, feeding on young leaves, flowers and fruit, especially in groves of the weeping peppermint Agonis flexuosa. Breeding occurs mainly during the winter, the single juvenile emerging from the pouch after about three months. The population has declined by more than 95% since British settlement, due to clearing of habitat, fire and the introduction of the red fox Vulpes vulpes, and is classified as Critically Endangered. The population in most areas has catastrophically declined or become locally extinct, but strongholds remain in the urbanised areas near Busselton and Albany.

== Taxonomy ==
A description of the species was published in 1888 by Oldfield Thomas in a systematic review of specimens held at the British Museum of Natural History. The animal was first described as Pseudochirus occidentalis by Thomas, repeating an incorrect spelling of the genus, and currently recognised as Pseudocheirus occidentalis. The classification as subspecies Pseudocheirus peregrinus occidentalis allies the population to the ringtail P. peregrinus which is common in Eastern Australia.

The original description of the western population was as a separate species, Pseudocheirus occidentalis, although it is also noted as a subspecies or member of a Pseudocheirus peregrinus species complex.

Common names include the western ringtail possum, ngwayir, womp, woder, ngoor and ngoolangit. The names derived from the Noongar language were collated in an ethnographic survey of historical interviews, and included two names noted by John Gilbert and others at the Swan River Colony, King George Sound and elsewhere; the local names for this species are regionally distinct rather than dialectical variants. The common name assigned by Oldfield Thomas in his description of P. occidentalis was western ring-tailed phalanger.

== Description ==
Western ringtails are largely-arboreal marsupials smaller than the size of a domestic cat, with stocky bodies, grasping feet and a strong, prehensile tail. The profile of the black back and rump slopes toward a prehensile tail that tapers to a fine white point. The species has a head and body length of 320–400 mm, a tail length of 300–400 mm, and a weight of 750 to 1350 g. Pseudocheirus occidentalis has dark grey-brown-black fur with light patches behind the ears and a creamy white, sometimes greyish, colour at the underside of the body that extends to the chest and throat. It differs from the common ringtail possum found on the east of the continent, by lacking any rufous colouration in the fur.

== Distribution and habitat ==
The western ringtail is endemic to south-western Western Australia where it is now found in three main areas; the Swan Coastal Plain, Southern Forests around Manjimup, and the South Coast between Walpole and Cheynes Beach.

In the Swan Coastal Plain and South Coast, the species favours habitat dominated by Peppermint, as well as Tuart, marri, jarrah, karri, Bullich, Albany blackbutt, Allocasuarina, Banksia, Kunzea, Nuytsia, and Xylomelum. In the Southern Forests, peppermint is generally absent and the western ringtails live in jarrah-dominated eucalypt forests. Western ringtails also frequent many urban and peri-urban gardens, where they feed on a variety of native and introduced plants.

Urban populations surveyed in the city of Albany have revealed an average individual range of 0.88 hectares, moving from their dreys in the day to their preferred night-time habitat in eucalypts. The study demonstrated that populations varied in their use of habitat and the size of the range was dependent on qualities such as the extent and connections of the canopy cover in its favoured tree species.

Since colonial settlement it has undergone a substantial range contraction, up to 90 per cent of the predicted original range. Archaeological records and known locations estimate a historical range that extended southwest from Geraldton to the Hampton Tableland, 200 km west of the border of South Australia.

== Behaviour ==
The western ringtail is an arboreal and nocturnal herbivore with a relatively small home range of 0.5-6 ha, dependent on habitat type. It uses tree hollows and builds dreys for shelter in tree canopies, their nest-like drey is an assemblage of shredded bark, twigs and leaves. They are primarily arboreal, but will move through understorey or open ground to feed or gain shelter when the tree canopy is unconnected. Sheltering at ground level is recorded, though not usual, more frequently be found at hollows and the upper story of a forest; the species has occasionally been seen to occupy rabbit burrows.

Western ringtails are folivorous; their diet includes leaves, shoots, fruit and flowers of a range of plants, both native and introduced. Favoured food trees include jarrah, marri, and Peppermint. The quality of food sources vary across time and space, and in particular are related to the availability of water and the intensity of recent fire. Young leaves are preferred, avoiding the lignin content of mature plant matter. The species is coprophagic, re-consuming faecal matter digested during the day to increase the nutrients derived from their food.

Births occur mainly in winter to spring, where usually one young is raised to maturity, although twins may be present in the pouch. Juveniles emerge from the pouch at about three months of age, when they weigh about 125 g, and suckle until they are 6–7 months old, weighing about 550 g. In the wild, western ringtail life spans has been recorded as up to four years in a jarrah forest, and six years on the Swan Coastal Plain, while in captivity, a female under care in a rehabilitation facility lived for nine years.

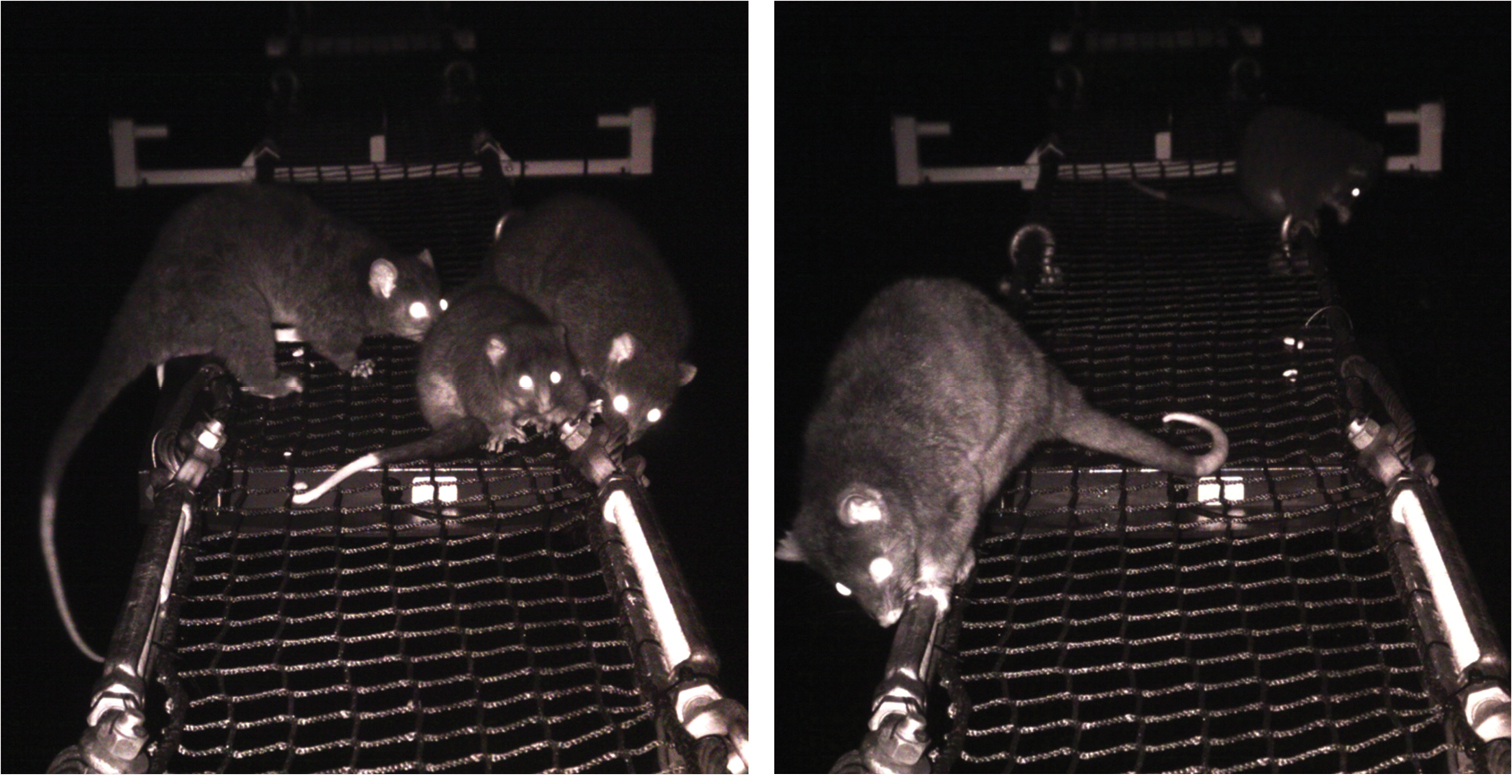
P. occidentalis on a rope bridge

The species will attempt to cross roadways within their foraging range, which leads to a high degree of fatalities as road kill. As a localised conservation measure to reduce the impact of urbanisation on western ringtails, a rope bridge trial was conducted near Busselton. Western ringtails were recorded investigating the bridge while it was still under construction, and the first crossing was recorded one month after construction was completed. During the study period, western ringtails were recorded crossing up to nine crossings per night, although less frequently when weather or moonlight inhibited their movements, and its use was adopted by juveniles who had been carried across by their mother. The success of the rope bridge was greater than anticipated when compared to rope bridge adoption by possums and gliders in similar programs.

== Conservation ==
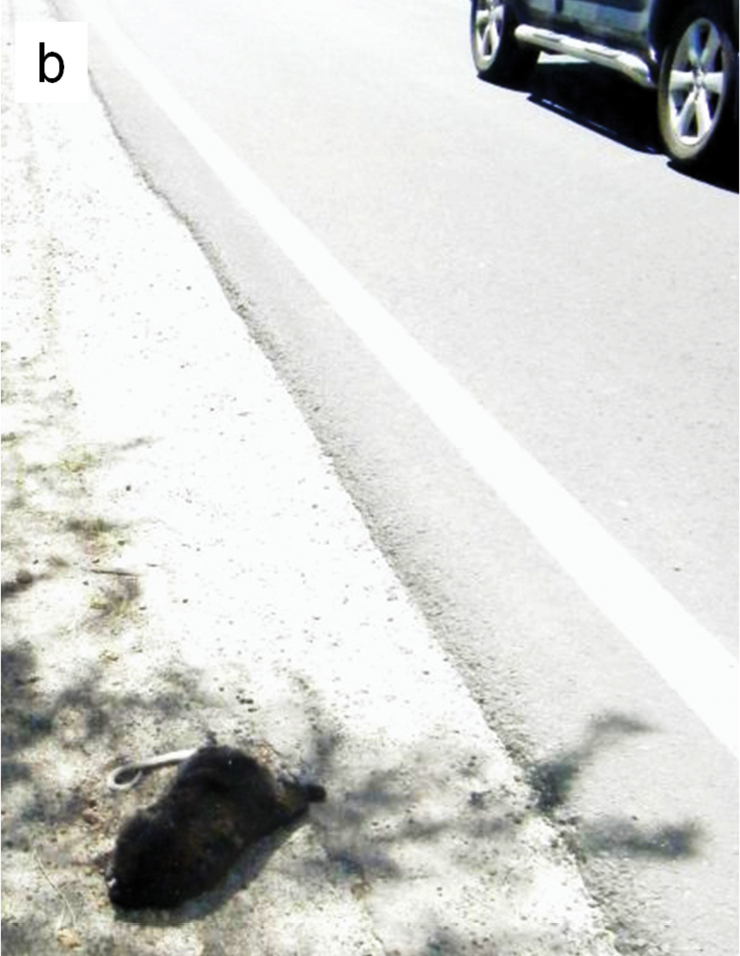
Western ringtail road fatality in Busselton, Western Australia

Three "key management zones" have been identified as known to support significant numbers of western ringtail possums. These include the Swan Coastal Plain, Southern Forests around Manjimup, and the South Coast between Walpole and Cheynes Beach. Within these zones, the threats to western ringtails are complex, interactive and often population-specific. These threats include habitat loss and fragmentation, introduced predators (particularly the red fox), climate change, timber harvesting, and inappropriate fire regimes.

In 2017, the conservation status of the species was re-assessed by the International Union for Conservation of Nature, and classified as critically endangered, with an estimated population of around 3,400 individuals. However since then, surveys of over 40 public reserves across the south-west have found more than 20,000 western ringtail possums. In addition, western ringtails are known to reside in many cities, towns, and rural areas including Albany, Busselton, and Dunsborough. Residents across the south-west are being encouraged to make their properties possum-friendly to contribute to their conservation.
