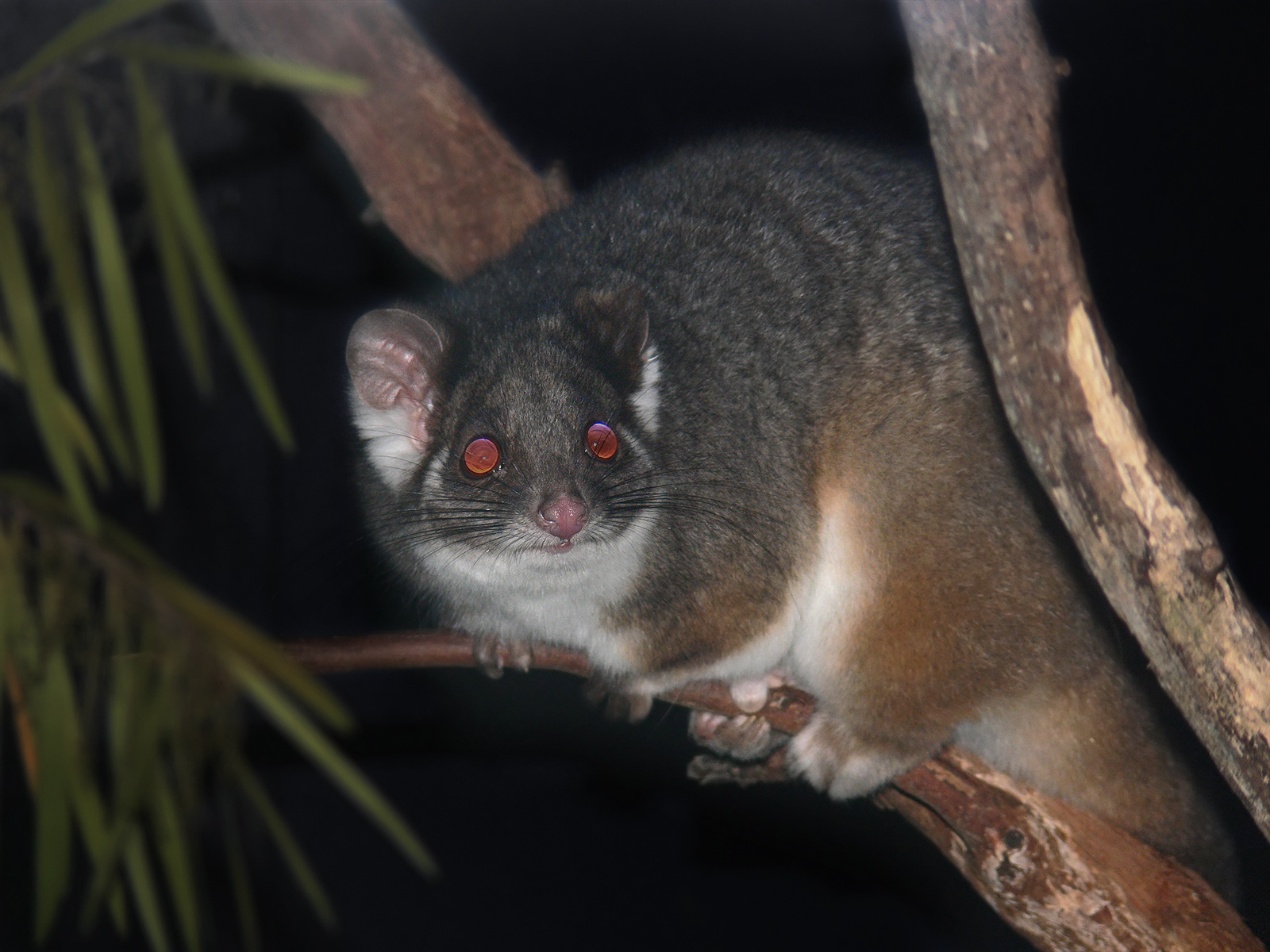

Conservation status
- Least Concern (IUCN 3.1)

Scientific classification
- Kingdom: Animalia
- Phylum: Chordata
- Class: Mammalia
- Infraclass: Marsupialia
- Order: Diprotodontia
- Family: Pseudocheiridae
- Genus: Pseudocheirus
- Species: P. peregrinus

Binomial name
- Pseudocheirus peregrinus (Boddaert, 1785)
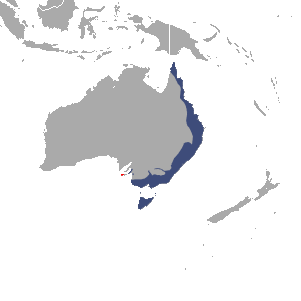
- Common ringtail possum range (except Western ringtail possum (Pseudocheirus peregrinus occidentalis) range) (blue — native, red — introduced)

= Common ringtail possum =

Species of marsupial

The common ringtail possum (Pseudocheirus peregrinus, Greek for "false hand" and Latin for "pilgrim" or "alien") is an Australian marsupial.

The possum lives in a variety of habitats and eats a variety of leaves of both native and introduced plants, as well as flowers, fruits and sap. It also consumes caecotropes, which are material fermented in the caecum and expelled during the daytime when it is resting in a nest. This behaviour is called caecotrophy and is similar to that seen in rabbits.

The possum carries its young in a pouch, where it develops for 120–130 days before leaving. They are affected by land clearing, which destroys their habitat. The red fox is an introduced invasive species and predator that negatively impacts the possum.

== Taxonomy ==
The common ringtail possum is currently classified as one of the two living species in the genus Pseudocheirus; the species of Pseudochirulus and other ringtail genera were formerly also classified in Pseudocheirus. Several subspecies have been described:

- Pseudocheirus peregrinus pereginus, the type subspecies based on a collection made at Endeavour River
- Pseudocheirus peregrinus convolutor, (Eastern ringtail possum or Southeastern ringtail possum)
- Pseudocheirus peregrinus pulcher, (Rufous ringtail possum)

Pseudocheirus occidentalis (Ngwayir, or the Western ringtail possum), found in the south west of Australia, used to be considered a subspecies of Pseudocheirus peregrinus; however, it is now formally considered a separate species.

== Description ==
The common ringtail possum weighs between 550 and 1,100 g (19 and 39 oz) and is approximately 30–35 cm (12–14 in) long when grown (excluding the tail, which is roughly the same length again). It has grey or black fur with white patches behind the eyes and usually a cream-coloured belly. It has a long prehensile tail which normally displays a distinctive white tip over 25% of its length. The back feet are syndactyl, which helps it to climb. The ringtail possum's molars have sharp and pointed cusps.

== Distribution and habitat ==
The common ringtail possum ranges on the east coast of Australia, as well as Tasmania and a part of southwestern Australia. They generally live in temperate and tropical environments and are rare in drier environments. Ringtail possums prefer forests of dense brush, particularly eucalyptus forests. The common ringtail possum and its relatives occupy a range of niches similar to those of lemurs, monkeys, squirrels, and bushbabies in similar forests on other continents. It is less prolific and less widespread than the common brushtail possum.

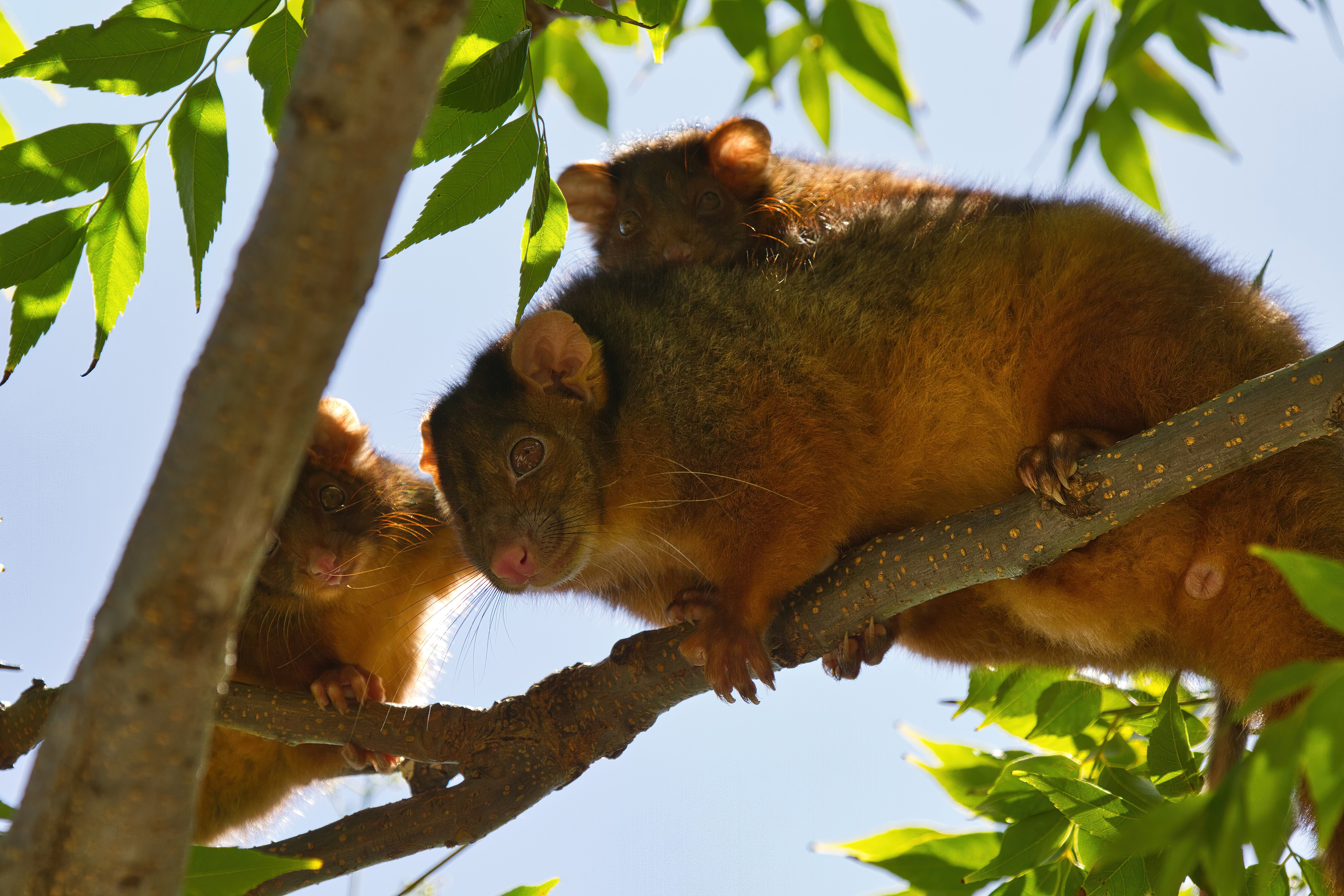
A common ringtail possum carrying young.

== Behaviour ==
The common ringtail possum is nocturnal and well adapted to arboreal life. It relies on its prehensile tail and sometimes will descend to the ground. They communicate with soft, high-pitched, and twittering calls.

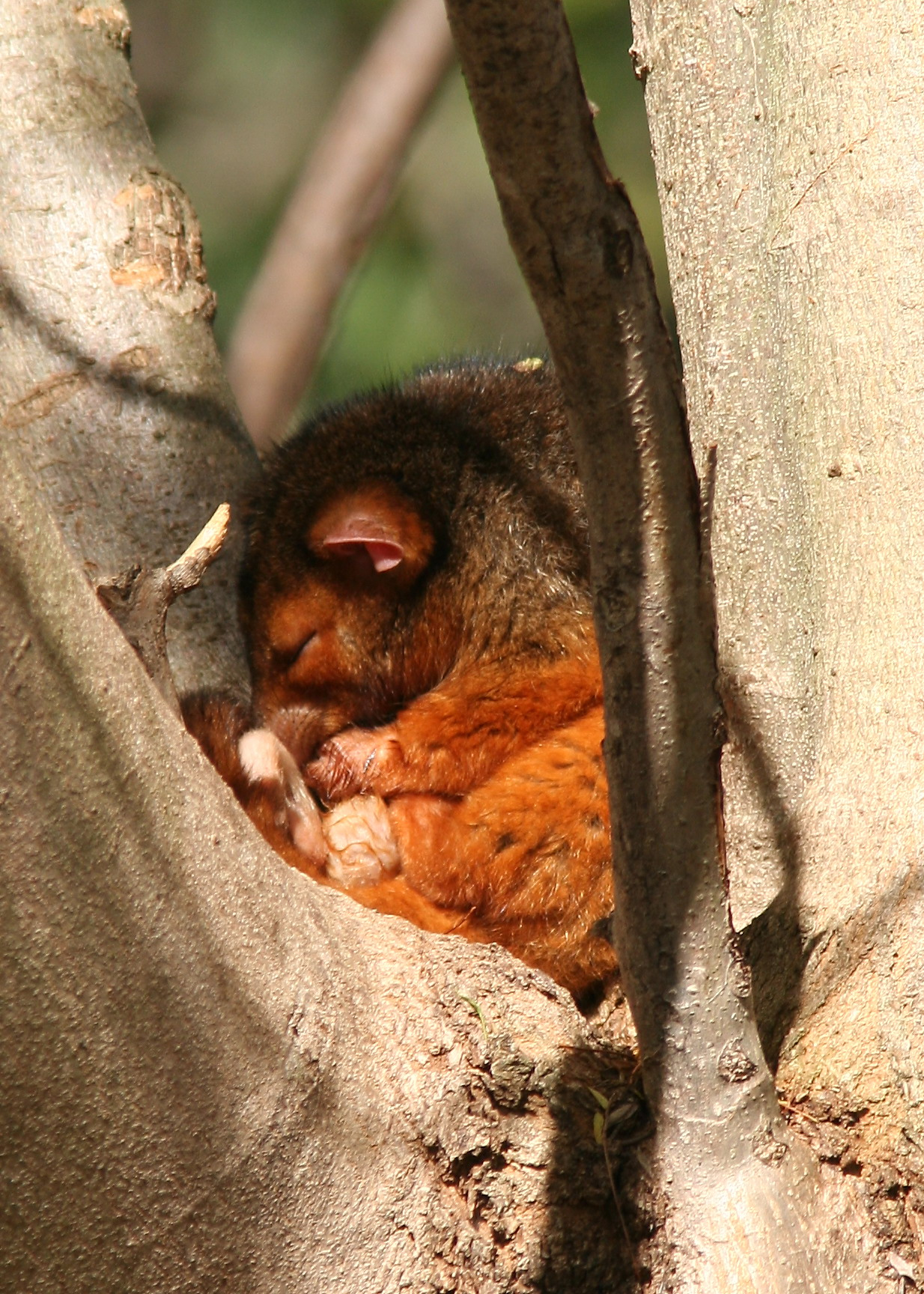
Asleep in daytime roost. Common ringtails usually build nests. This one prefers the open air.

=== Diet and foraging ===
The common ringtail possum feeds on a wide variety of plants in the family Myrtaceae including the foliage, flowers and fruits from shrubs and lower canopy. Some populations are also known to feed on the leaves of cypress pine (Callitris), wattles (Acacia spp.) and plant gum or resins.

When foraging, ringtail possums prefer young leaves over old ones. One study found the emergence of young possums from their pouches corresponds to the flowering and fruiting of the tea-tree, Leptospermum and the peak of fresh plant growth. Young eucalypt leaves are richer in nitrogen and have less dense cell walls than older leaves; however, the protein gained from them is less available due to higher amounts of tannins. When feeding, the possum's molars slice through the leaves, slitting them into pieces. The possum's gastrointestinal tract sends the fine particles to the caecum and the coarse ones to the colon. These particles stay in the caecum for up to 70 hours where the cell walls and tanned cytoplasts are partially digested.

What distinguishes the digestive system of the common ringtail possum from that of the koala and the greater glider is the caecal contents are expelled as caecotropes, reingested and passed into the stomach. Because of this, the ringtail possum is able to gain more protein. This is also done by lagomorphs (rabbits, hares and pikas). Hard faeces are produced during the night while feeding and are not eaten, while caecotropes are produced during the day during rests and are eaten.

=== Metabolism ===
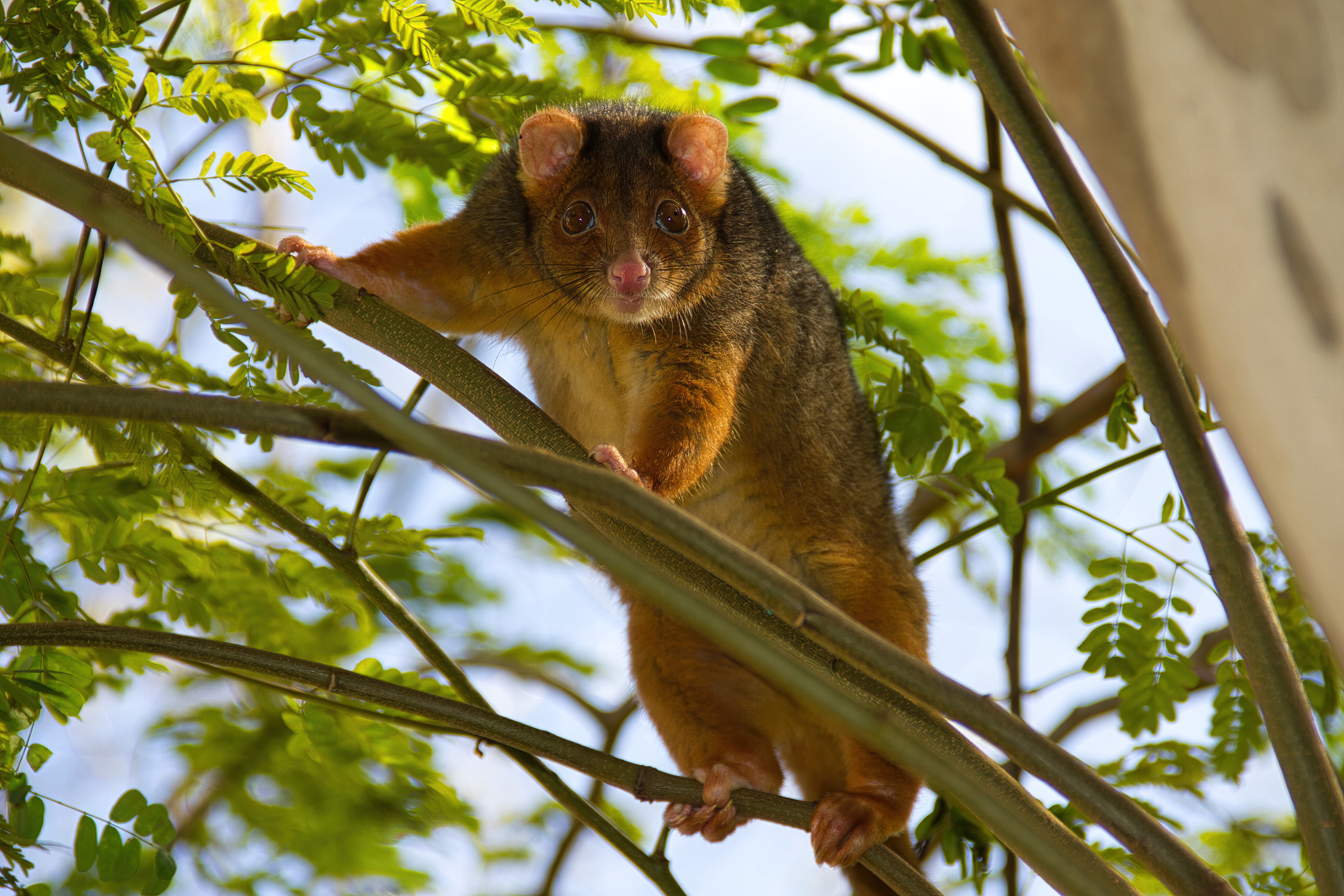
Common ringtail possum in Brisbane, Queensland.

The re-ingestion of caecotropes also serves to maintain the ringtail possum's energy balance. Ringtail possums gain much of their gross energy from reingestion. The common ringtail possum has a daily maintenance nitrogen requirement (MNR) of 290 mg N/kg^{0.75}. Common ringtail possums gain much of their MNR from consuming their nitrogen-rich caecotropes. They would have to gain 620 mg N/kg^{0.75} otherwise. The ringtail possum recycles 96% of its liver's urea, which is then transferred into the caecum and made into bacterial protein. Only re-ingestion makes this effective and the bacterial protein must be digested in the stomach and the amino acids subsequently absorbed in the small intestine. This recycling also allows the possum to conserve water and urinate less. Reingestion allows the possum to live on low nitrogen eucalyptus leaves which is particularly important during late lactation. It has been found that at higher temperatures, the common ringtail possum consumes less food due to a limited ability to metabolize toxins found in their diet. Because 55% of their water intake comes from the leaves and foliage they consume, their metabolic rate must remain low and stable while facing water loss. In response to this challenge, common ringtail possums can control their body temperature and conserve water by using facultative hyperthermia to temporarily raise their internal body temperature, ranging from 29 to 39 °C (84 to 102 °F).

=== Nesting ===
Common ringtail possums live a gregarious lifestyle which centres on their communal nests, also called dreys. Ringtail possums build nests from tree branches and use tree hollows. A communal nest is made up of an adult female and an adult male, their dependant offspring and immature offspring of the previous year. A group of ringtail possums may build several dreys at different sites. Ringtail possums are territorial and will drive away any strange conspecifics from their nests. A group has a strong attachment to their site. In one experiment, in which a group was removed from their territory, it remained uncolonised for the following two years. Ringtail possum nests tend to be more common in low scrub and less common in heavily timbered areas with little under-story. Dreys contribute to the survival of the young when they are no longer carried on their mother's back.

=== Reproduction and growth ===
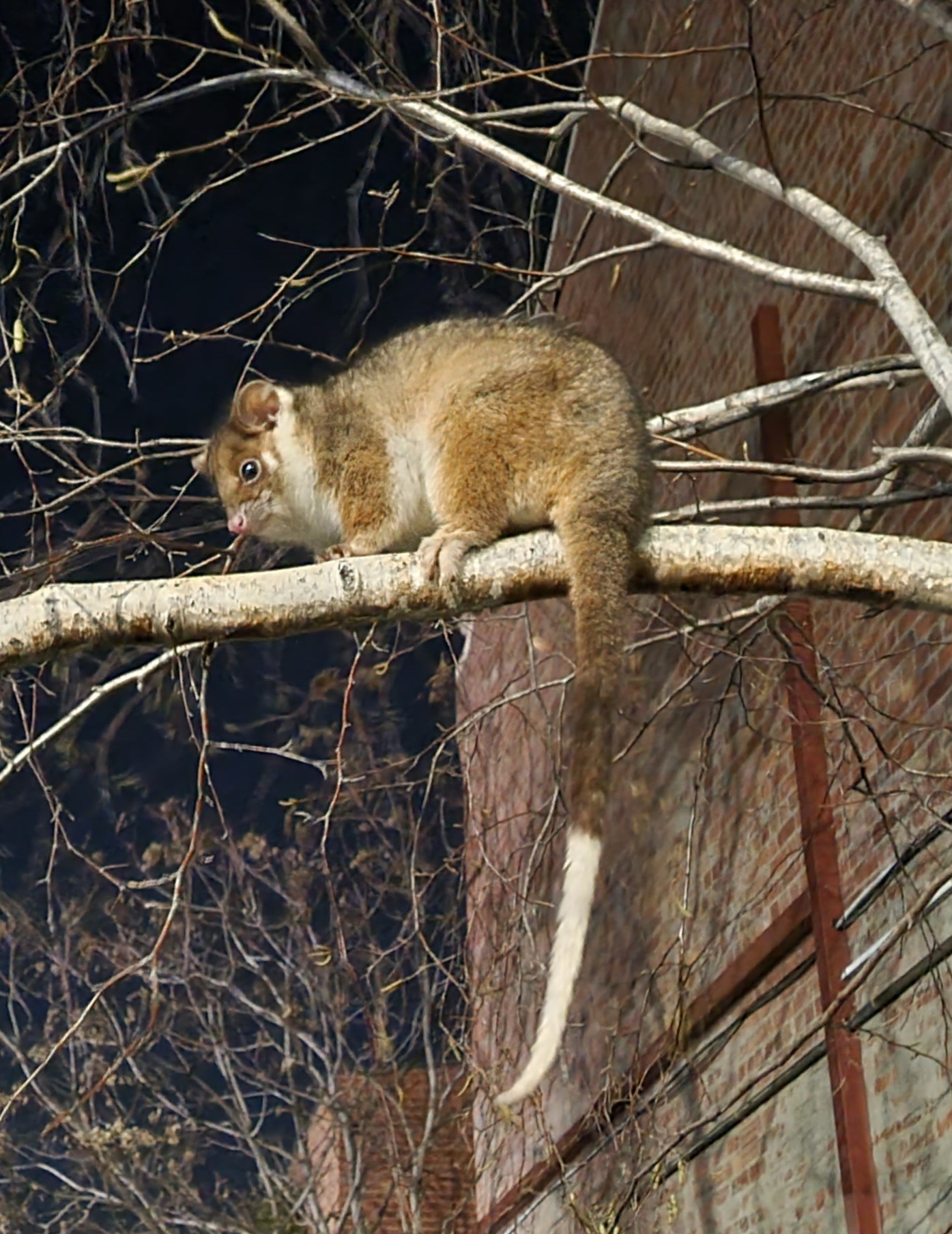
Common ringtail possum in South Yarra, Victoria.

The common ringtail possum carries its young in a pouch, where it develops. Depending on the area, the mating season can take place anywhere between April and December. The majority of the young are born between May and July. The oestrous cycle of ringtail possum lasts 28 days. It is both polyoestrous and polyovular. If a female prematurely loses her litter, she can return to oestrous and produce a second litter in October as a replacement if conditions are right. The average litter is two, although there are very occasionally triplets. Common ringtail possum young tend to grow relatively slowly due to dilute milk with low lipid levels that is provided to the young. As with other marsupials, the common ringtail possum's milk changes through lactation. During the second phase of lactation, more solid foods are eaten, especially when the young first emerges from the pouch. During this time, the concentration of carbohydrates fall, while those of proteins and lipids reach their highest. The long lactation of the ringtail possums may give the young more time to learn skills in the communal nest as well as to climb and forage in the trees.

The young are first able to vocalise and open their eyes between 90 and 106 days of age. They leave their mother's pouch at 120–130 days. However, lactation usually continues until 180–220 days after birth but sometimes ends by 145 days. Both sexes become sexually mature in the first mating season after their birth.

== Status ==
Common ringtail possum populations severely declined during the 1950s. However, populations seem to have recovered in recent times. Because they are largely arboreal, common ringtail possums are particularly affected by deforestation in Australia. They are also heavily preyed upon by the introduced red fox. They are also hit by cars, or killed by snakes, cats and dogs in suburban areas.
