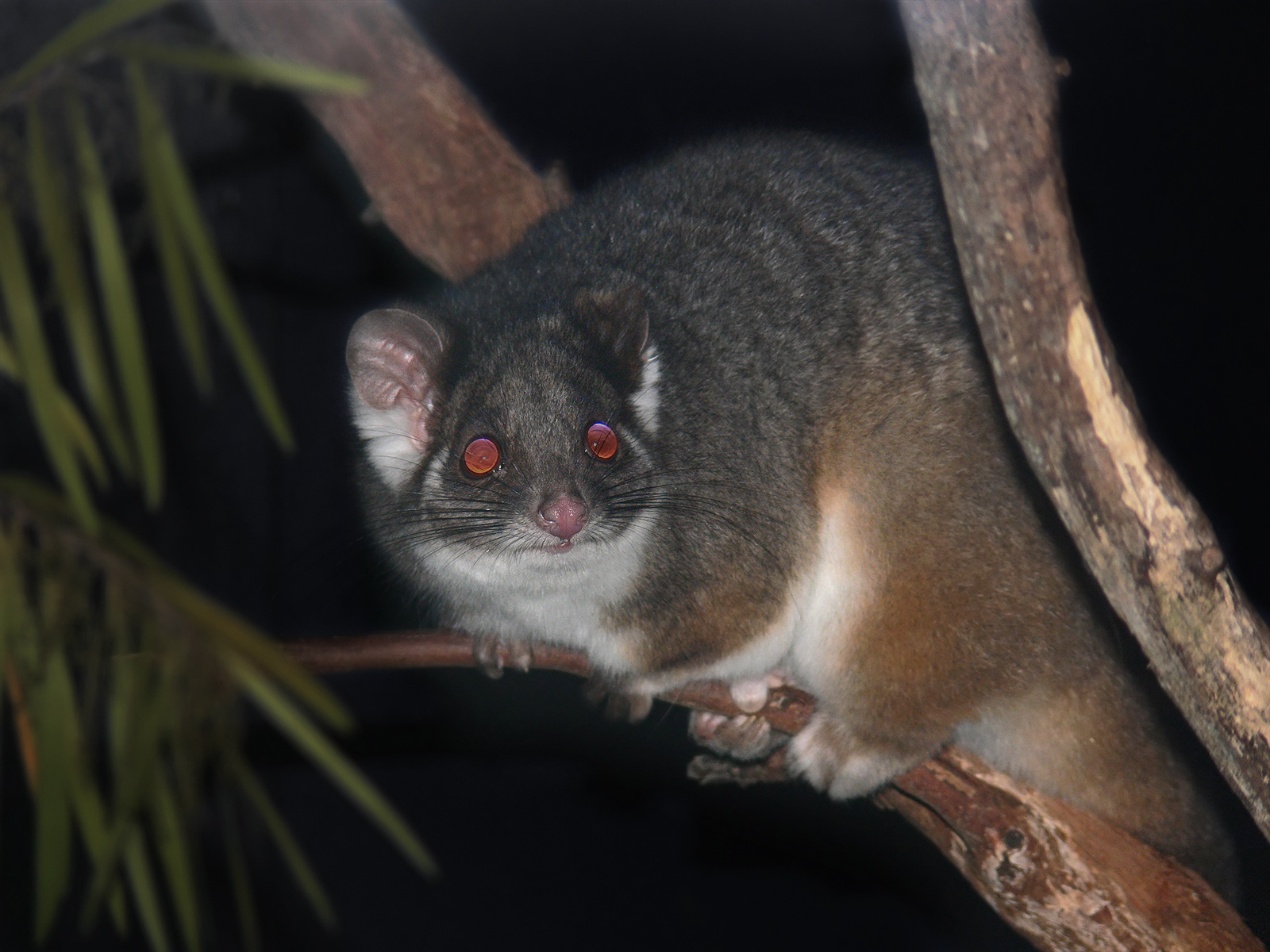
- Common ringtail possum (Pseudocheirus peregrinus)

Scientific classification
- Kingdom: Animalia
- Phylum: Chordata
- Class: Mammalia
- Infraclass: Marsupialia
- Order: Diprotodontia
- Family: Pseudocheiridae
- Subfamily: Pseudocheirinae
- Genus: Pseudocheirus; Ogilby, 1837

Type species
- Pseudocheirus peregrinus Boddaert, 1785 (= Phalangista cookii Desmarest, 1818)

Species
- †Pseudocheirus marshalli; Pseudocheirus peregrinus; Pseudocheirus occidentalis

= Pseudocheirus =

Genus of marsupials

Pseudocheirus is a genus of ringtail possums (family Pseudocheiridae). It includes a single living species, the common ringtail possum (Pseudocheirus peregrinus) of Australia, as well as the fossil Pseudocheirus marshalli from the Pliocene of Victoria.

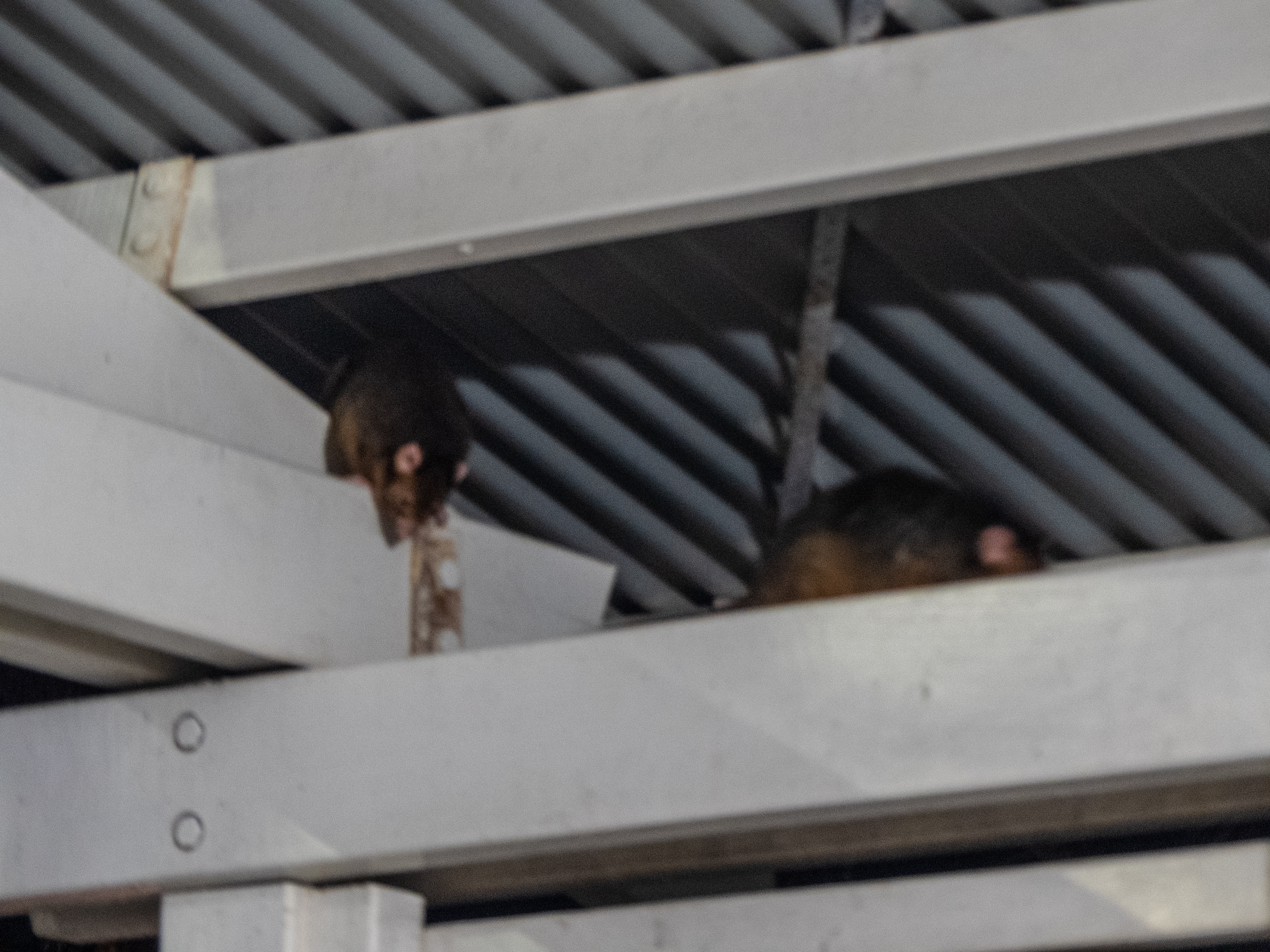

Other species have previously been included in this genus. Most other ringtails—the lemur-like ringtail (Hemibelideus lemuroides), the rock-haunting ringtail (Petropseudes dahli), and the various species of Pseudochirulus and Pseudochirops—were classified in Pseudocheirus until the 1980s or 1990s. A second ringtail from the Victorian Pliocene, Petauroides stirtoni, was originally named as a Pseudocheirus, but is now considered to be more closely related to the greater glider (Petauroides volans).

The genus was erected by William Ogilby in 1837, the same author later using then correcting the spelling Pseudochirus that is now regarded as a nomenclatural synonym used in error by authors such as Oldfield Thomas.

Taxonomic opinion favours treatment of the western population, Pseudocheirus peregrinus occidentalis, as a separate species (Pseudocheirus occidentalis), though the contradictory evidence from current studies have prevented this recommendation being published.

== Literature cited ==
- Groves, C.P. 2005. Order Diprotodontia. Pp. 43–70 in Wilson, D.E. and Reeder, D.M. (eds.). Mammal Species of the World: a taxonomic and geographic reference. 3rd ed. Baltimore: The Johns Hopkins University Press, 2 vols., 2142 pp. ISBN 978-0-8018-8221-0
- Turnbull, W.D., Lundelius, E.R. Jr. and Archer, M. 2003. Dasyurids, perameloids, phalangeroids, and vombatoids from the Early Pliocene Hamilton Fauna, Victoria, Australia. Bulletin of the American Museum of Natural History 279:513–540.
