= Buckingham Gate drill halls =

- London
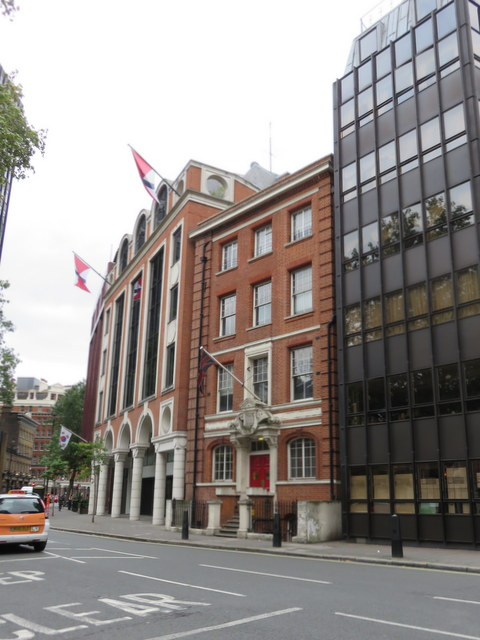
- 58 (centre) and 59 (beyond) Buckingham Gate

Site information
- Type: Drill halls

Location
- Location within London
- Coordinates: 51.49815°N 0.13641°W

Site history
- Built: 1886
- Built for: War Office
- In use: 1886-Present

The Buckingham Gate drill halls were military installations at 58 and 59 Buckingham Gate, London.

== History ==
=== 58 Buckingham Gate ===
The building was designed as the headquarters of the 13th Middlesex (Queen's Westminster) Volunteer Rifle Corps and completed in 1886. That unit became the 16th (County of London) Battalion, London Regiment (Queen's Westminster Rifles) in 1908. The battalion was mobilised at the drill hall in August 1914 before being deployed to the Western Front.

In 1937, on the break-up of the London Regiment, the unit based at the drill hall was redesignated the Queen's Westminsters, King's Royal Rifle Corps. The regiment amalgamated with the Queen Victoria's Rifles in 1961 and moved out to the Davies Street drill hall.

In the 1970s the drill hall was used by the Army Cadet Force Association and, in the late 20th century, it was used extensively by the Metropolitan Police Service. It still survives and is currently used as an office facility.

=== 59 Buckingham Gate ===
The building was designed by John Macvicar Anderson as the headquarters of the 7th (London Scottish) Middlesex Volunteer Rifle Corps and was opened by the Duke of Cambridge in July 1886. From 1899 to 1901 the All England Open Badminton Championships were held in the drill hall. The 7th (London Scottish) Middlesex Volunteer Rifle Corps became the 14th (County of London) Battalion, London Regiment (London Scottish) in 1908.

In May 1912 the drill hall was used as the location for the inquiry into the sinking of RMS Titanic.

In August 1914, the 14th (County of London) Battalion was mobilised at the drill hall before being deployed to the Western Front. In 1937, on the break-up of the London Regiment, the unit based at the drill hall was re-designated as The London Scottish, The Gordon Highlanders.

In April 1944, during the Second World War, Princess Elizabeth visited a Sea Scouts exhibition at the drill hall. In 1947 the regiment was reconstituted but with its headquarters still at the drill hall.

The drill hall was demolished in 1985 and parts of the structure, including the wrought-iron roof, the double-level iron galleries and the war memorials, were relocated to the new Horseferry Road drill hall. The Buckingham Gate site has since been redeveloped for offices and the Swire Group now occupies the office block on the site.

== Sources ==
- Osborne, Mike (2006). Always Ready: The Drill Halls of Britain's Volunteer Forces. Partizan Press. ISBN 978-1858185095.
