= Altinaghree Castle =

Ruined castle in Northern Ireland

Coordinates: 54.880°N 7.246°W

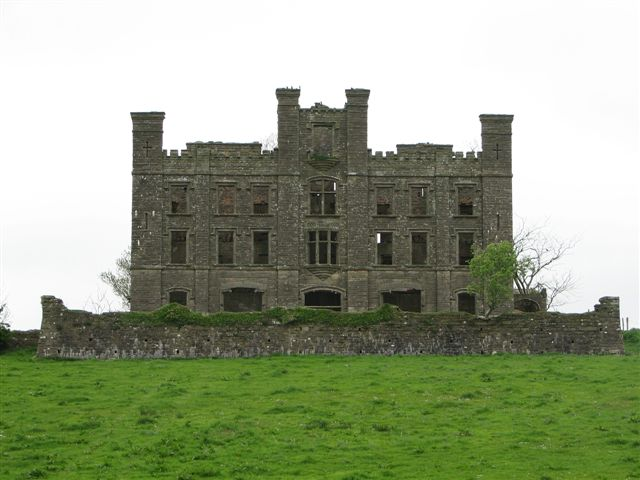
Altinaghree Castle, 2006

Altinaghree Castle or Liscloon House, known locally as Ogilby's Castle, is a large, derelict building situated outside Donemana, County Tyrone, Northern Ireland. It is believed to have been built around 1860 by William Ogilby.

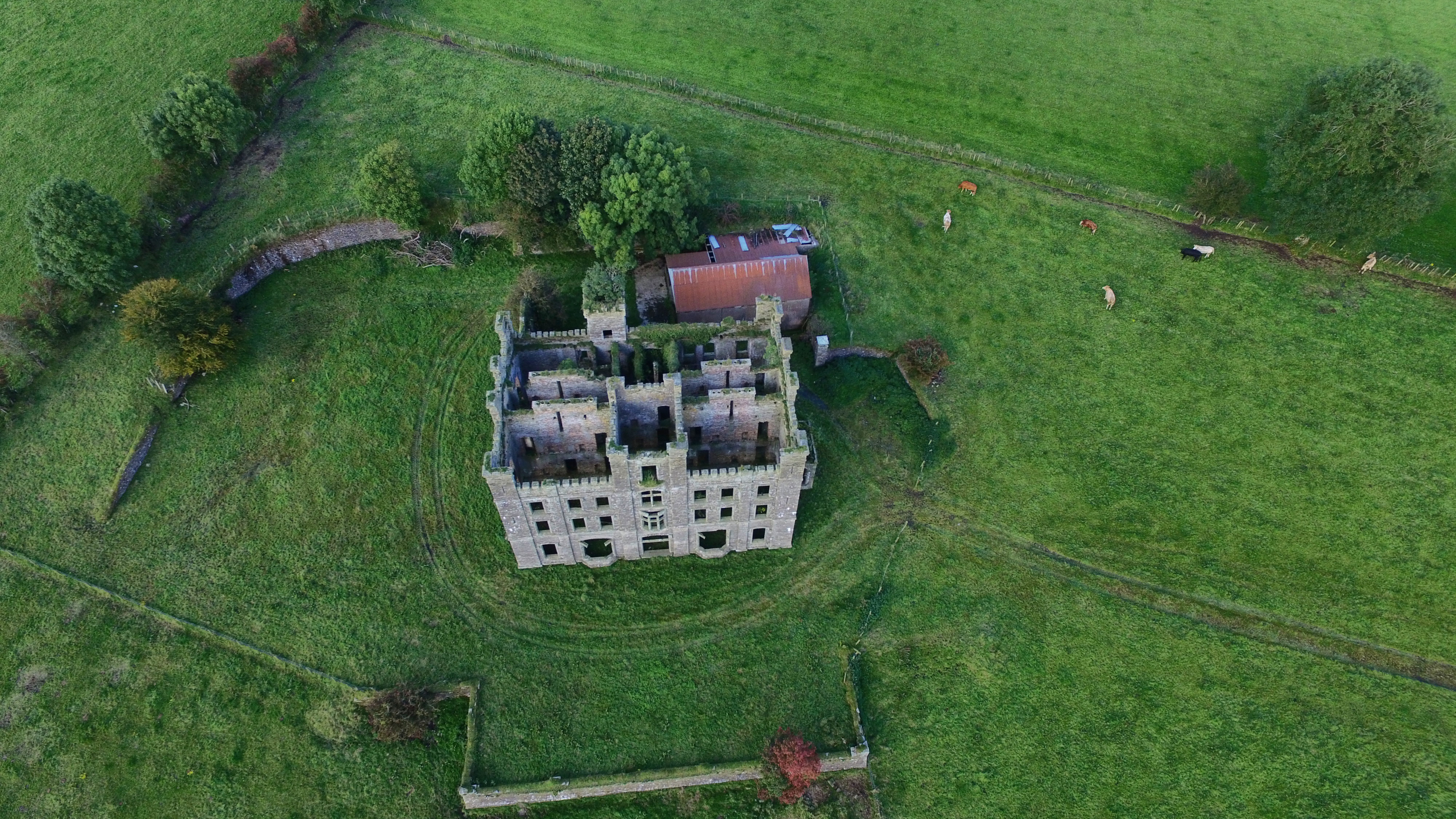
Drone view of Ogilby's Castle

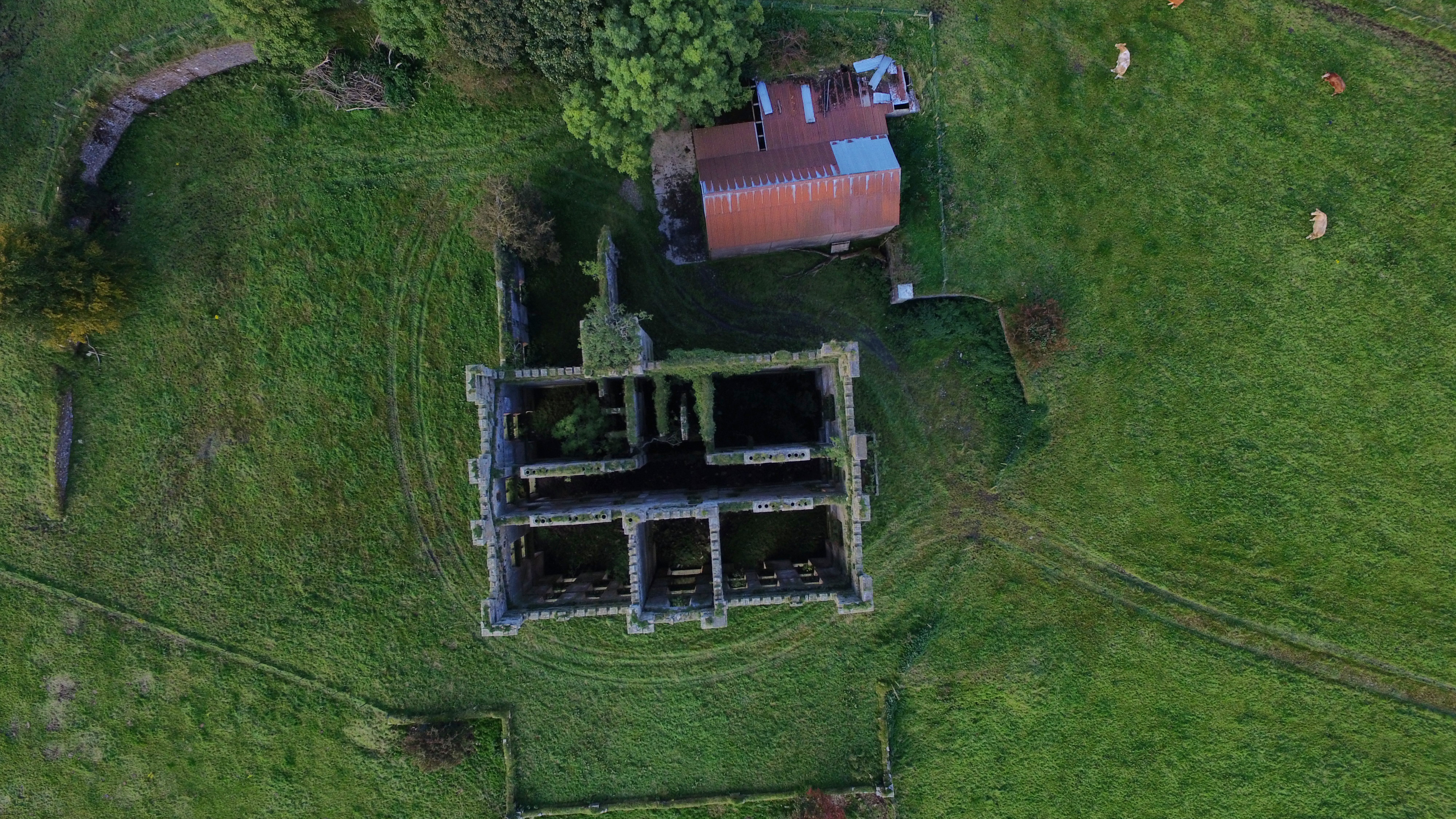
Drone view of Ogilby's Castle

== Location ==
The castle is located near Donemana, County Tyrone, Northern Ireland.

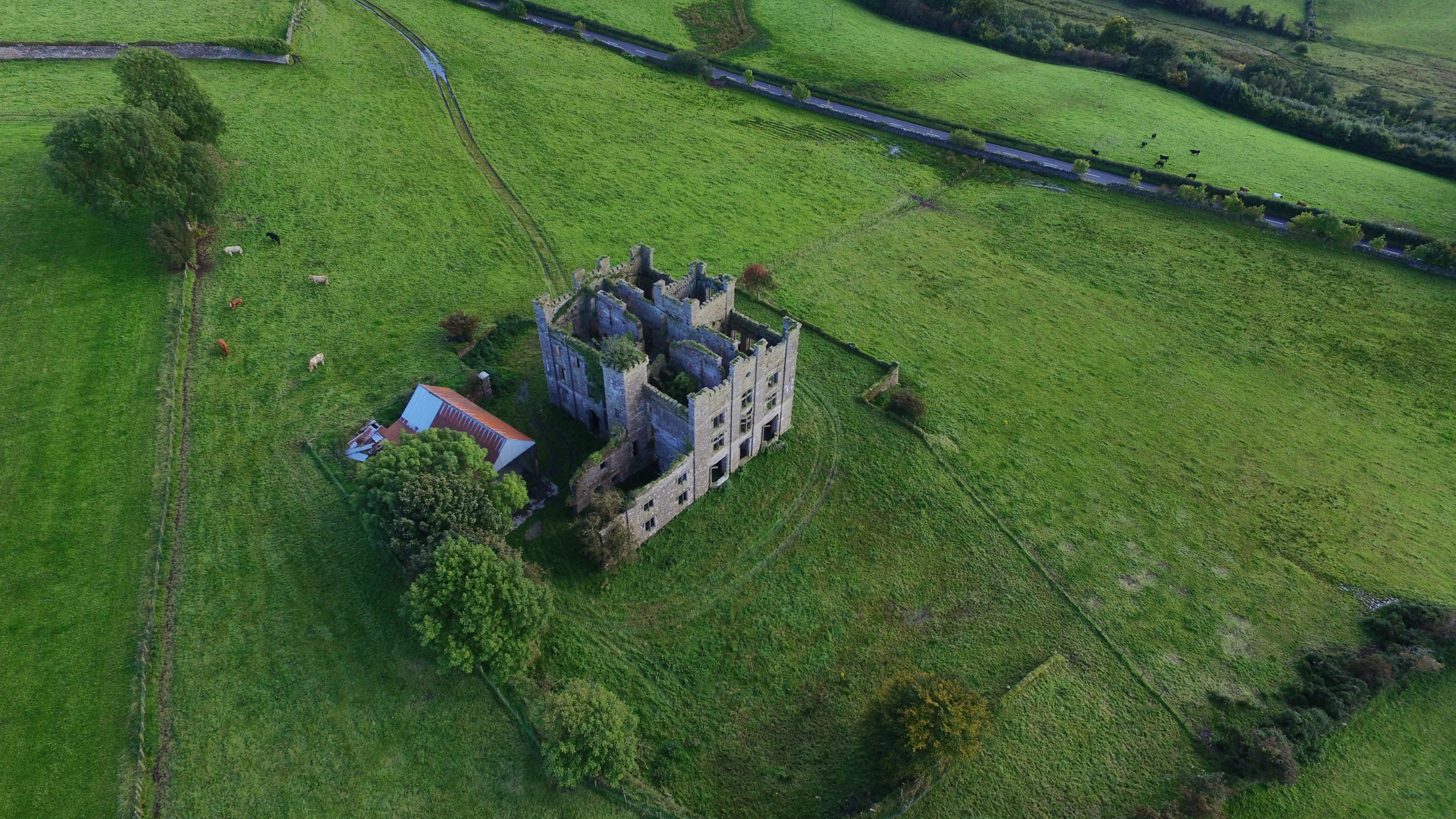
Ogilby's Castle

== Description ==
Altinaghree Castle is a ruined building situated on private farmland outside Donemana, south of Londonderry in County Tyrone. It is also known as Altnacree Castle, Liscloon House, and is known locally as Ogilby's Castle. It was once a large elegant building with magnificent banquet room, and is constructed from cut stone.

== Facilities ==
The castle is on private land and is not open to the public, but can be seen and photographed from the main Dunamanagh – Claudy Road (B49).

The castle also had a small number of workmen's houses to the south-east of the property called 'Liscloon Cottages'. These are current in use today for farm outbuildings.

== History ==
The castle is believed to have been built by William Ogilby around 1860. It was this luxurious Estate that Claude William Leslie, eldest son of William, inherited. Becoming bankrupt, the castle was abandoned in 1885, only some 25 years after it was built. In 1875. Claude died at the age of 43 from kidney failure caused by years of chronic alcoholism, a sad ending to the succession of the estate and castle in Liscloon.

His younger son, James Douglas Ogilby, later became a famous ichthyologist in Australia. James fell in love with a factory seamstress, Mary Jane Jamieson, and was denied permission to marry her because she was a Catholic. They eloped and married in 1884. He moved to Australia where he was appointed to the Australian Museum in 1885. The castle was abandoned by the end of the century and fell into disrepair.

== See also ==
- Castles in Northern Ireland
