= William Ogilby =

Irish zoologist

William Ogilby FRAS FLS FZS FGS MRIA
- Born: 1805; County Londonderry, Ireland
- Died: 1 September 1873 (aged 67–68); Dublin, Ireland
- Education: Trinity College, Cambridge
- Known for: Classification and naming of animal species
- Children: 5 sons, including James Douglas Ogilby; five daughters
- Scientific career
- Fields: Zoologist
- Author abbrev. (zoology): Ogilby

William Ogilby (1805 – 1 September 1873) was an Irish-born zoologist who was at the forefront of classification and naming of animal species in the 1830s and served as Secretary of the Zoological Society of London from 1839 to 1847. He removed to Ireland during the Great Famine and later built the grand but architecturally dismal Altinaghree Castle near Donemana, County Tyrone. Mount Ogilby in Queensland was named for him in 1846.

== Birth, family background and education ==
Probably born in County Londonderry in 1805, (Note: Edward Walford, in County Families of the United Kingdom, 1860, states that Ogilby was born in 1808' but his age was recorded as 20 years on admission to Trinity College, Cambridge, in April 1824, and as 68 years in the record of his burial on 5 September 1873: J. A. Venn, Alumni Cantabrigienses, Part II, Vol. IV (Cambridge University Press, 1951), p. 582; Burial Register of St James's Church, Donagheady, 1828–80 (PRONI, MIC1/35).) William Ogilby was an illegitimate son of Leslie Ogilby (c1764-1845) who owned a bleaching green at Lackagh in the parish of Dungiven. The Ogilbys had been active in the linen trade since the mid-eighteenth century, and William's uncle Robert Ogilby (c1761-1839), having amassed a fortune as a linen factor in Dublin, bought the lease of the 22,000-acre Dungiven Castle estate (Note: In 1803 he paid The Skinners' Company £25,000 for a 61-year lease of the manor of Pellipar (including Dungiven Castle) at an annual rent of £1,500. He later purchased large holdings in the Limavady, Ballykelly and Cumber districts and, in 1812, the freehold of the Powis Street estate at Woolwich.) and was reckoned "the wealthiest commoner in the North of Ireland, possessing it is said between ten and twenty thousand pounds a year". The fortune of William's father was more modest but sufficient to buy the 3,170-acre Terkernaghan and Altnachree estate in Donagheady, County Tyrone, in 1829.

Illegitimate births were commonplace among the Ogilbys in the early nineteenth century, (Note: Leslie Ogilby's will (TNA, PROB11/202/289) recognised his several natural children by different mothers and mentioned the natural son of his deceased brother William. Another brother, Sir David Ogilby, had several illegitimate offspring.) and William seems to have been recognised as his father's heir from an early age. He was educated at a small academy kept by a clergyman in Macclesfield before proceeding to Belfast Academical Institution and thence to Trinity College, Cambridge in 1824. He graduated in 1828 and was called to the Bar by Lincoln's Inn in 1832.

His examination performance at Cambridge was unimpressive, (Note: He was placed in the second class in the Junior Sophs examination and twentieth out of twenty-seven in Junior Optimes (the third class) in the Mathematical Tripos: Ipswich Journal, 25 March 1826; Northampton Mercury, 26 January 1828.) perhaps indicating he neglected the necessary preparatory work in favour of studying natural history and science. His interest in the natural world was of early origin (Note: Proceedings of the Zoological Society of London, Part V, 1837, p. 58, records Ogilby having found a specimen of hippocampus (sea-horse) on the beach below Red Bay Castle, County Antrim, in July 1821.) and may have been kindled by relatives. His uncle Alexander Ogilby (c1756-1846) of Kilcatten House, Claudy, had a "curious and valuable collection of fossils" in his "choice little museum"; his maiden aunt Elizabeth Ogilby of Limavady "saved from the ravages of the lapidiary" a natural crystal which, weighing 70lbs, was in 1814 believed to be the largest in Ireland; and his older cousin, Leslie Ogilby, was an "accomplished naturalist and botanist" who successfully cultivated Ireland's rarer native plants and whose bequest of 400 books on scientific topics was an important addition to the Royal Dublin Society's library.

== Research and first publication ==
Over the course of a fortnight in March 1827, while still an undergraduate, William Ogilby examined at Cambridge a living specimen of the species he called the "whitefooted Paraduxure". He examined it again in London in August 1828, by which time he was sufficiently conversant with the organic structure of animals and the principles of taxonomy to recognise the creature as a previously undescribed species which he classified as intermediate between the common genet and the common cat and to which he assigned the name Paradoxurus leucopus. His description and classification of the animal appeared in a paper which was printed in The Zoological Journal of January 1829 and was the earliest among his many published contributions to zoological research. The species he identified was included in Coenraad Temminck's 1839 monograph on the genus Paradoxurus. (Note: Temminck acknowledged Ogilby's assistance in preparing the monograph but it was later suggested information provided to him by Ogilby was either incorrect or misunderstood: J. E. Gray, Proceedings of the Zoological Society of London, 1864, p. 527.) (Note: P. leucopus was later subsumed as a synonym of Paradoxurus hermaphroditus.)

Ogilby's arrival in London gave him access to the works of Continental naturalists and to specimens of animals and birds held by the British Museum, the Zoological and Linnean Societies, and the East India Company. He later became a regular visitor to the museums at Leiden and Paris, and he observed animal locomotion and behaviour at the Zoological Society's Regent's Park menagerie, the Surrey Zoological Gardens at Newington, the Ménagerie du Jardin des Plantes at Paris, and in private collections such as that of Lord Derby. He visited Germany (notably Berlin and Frankfurt) on several occasions and the Cape Colony more than once.

The breadth of his knowledge of literary sources from which useful natural history material could be quarried was evident when he alerted Professor Thomas Bell to an editorial note in Swift's Considerations about Maintaining the Poor referring to the importation of frogs to Dublin from England at the beginning of the eighteenth century.

== Zoological Society contributions and appointment ==
From 1830 onwards, at meetings of the Zoological Society, he read explanatory papers or delivered commentaries on specimens donated to the Society's museum. Some forty of his reports were printed in either full or abstract form in the Society's Transactions and Proceedings during the years to 1841, describing and classifying new examples of mammals and birds from Australia, Africa, the Americas and India. In the same period he also read similar papers to the Linnean Society and commented on fossil specimens to the Geological Society. Publication of his classifications established and named the several genera Cynictis (1833), Madoqua (1836), Pseudocheirus (1837), Chaeropus and Conilurus (1838), and placed many new species within previously established genera.

He chaired meetings of the Zoological Society from 1836 and by 1838 was not only one of its Fellows but also a Fellow of the Linnean, Geological and Royal Astronomical Societies. He was on terms of friendship with Charles Darwin, the Secretary of the Geographical Society, and in 1839 both men were elected to the Council of the Zoological Society, Ogilby becoming that Society's Secretary shortly afterwards. (Note: He officiated as Secretary for the first time on 4 July 1839: John Bull, 8 July 1839.) In this latter capacity he conducted the Society's correspondence, controlled and catalogued its museum, (Note: The Zoological Society's museum was at its offices in central London and then removed to Carnivora House at its Regent's Park menagerie. Its contents were donated to the British Museum in 1853: The History of the Collections contained in the Natural History Departments of the British Museum, Vol. II, 1906, p. 8.) recorded the animals in its zoological gardens and made recommendations for their purchase.

After his appointment as Secretary his contribution of scholarly papers and commentaries to Zoological Society meetings declined. He last named a species (Cercopithecus tantalus – the Tantalus monkey) in April 1841, and his final classification submission was made in January 1843. He continued as Secretary of the Society until resigning in 1847. He had been unremunerated in the post and was succeeded by a salaried official.

== Recognition ==
His "careful researches which have thrown considerable light on the affinities of the Ruminant species" were acknowledged in 1838 when George Waterhouse named a new species of antelope after him (Cephalophus ogilbii, or Ogilby's duiker). (Note: Waterhouse was treated less generously by Ogilby who was instrumental in the termination of Waterhouse's curatorship of the Zoological Society's museum and somewhat obstructive in his pursuit of employment at the British Museum: see Cambridge University Library, Darwin Correspondence Project, DCP-LETT-688, letter G. R. Waterhouse to Charles Darwin, 9 August 1843.) In the previous year W. H. Sykes had dedicated to him ("whose contributions to natural history are so well known") the discovery of a new member of the carp family in the Bihama River (Rohtee ogilbii).

In 1846 Sir Thomas Mitchell, after whom Ogilby had named Dipus mitchellii (Mitchell's hopping mouse) in 1838, reciprocated by the naming of Mount Ogilby in the Maranoa River region of Queensland, numbering Ogilby among "the individuals of our own race most distinguished or zealous in the advancement of science and the pursuit of human knowledge... sufficiently well-known in the world to preclude all necessity for further explanation why their names were applied to a part of the world's geography".

== The order called Chiropoda ==
In the summer of 1829, while studying the actions and organic structure of red howler monkeys, Ogilby noticed what had previously escaped general recognition: the creatures did not use their forelimb extremities to hold objects "between finger and thumb" because their "thumbs" were positioned not opposite but in the same line as the remainder of their digits. (Note: Ogilby later found that this had been recorded by Félix de Azara thirty years earlier but the record had passed generally unnoticed.) Over the next six years he gave particular attention to the other genera of South American monkeys and observed this characteristic as common to all of them. Whereas they had previously been regarded as quadrumana (four-handed), he believed they were properly pedimana (foot-handed).

Ogilby's study convinced him that the presence and architecture of hands were key indicators of relationship patterns among certain mammals, and he proposed recognition of a separate mammiferous order to be called cheiropoda (possessing hands) made up of bimana (comprising only man), quadrumana and pedimana (comprising, respectively, monkeys of the Old World and monkeys of the New World). He presented the proposal to the Zoological Society on 8 March 1836 in his paper "Observations on the opposable Power of the Thumb in certain Mammals". This was printed in the Magazine of Natural History in the following year and acclaimed by the systematist Hugh Strickland to be "one of the most valuable and important memoirs ever communicated to this magazine".

Ogilby took the classification cheiropoda into actual use and it was recognised and explained, probably by him, in Charles Knight's The Penny Cyclopaedia of 1837. In 1838 he enshrined its basis in his 442-page book, The Natural History of Monkeys, Opossums, and Lemurs, published by Knight for the Society for the Diffusion of Useful Knowledge as part of the popular series The Menageries. As was the case with other volumes in the series, it appeared anonymously and, although Ogilby referred to himself as the author and was credited as such in The Penny Cyclopaedia, his anonymity has resulted in misattribution. Anonymity on other occasions may conceal a substantial body of work by Ogilby. (Note: Monkeys, Opossums and Lemurs has been widely attributed to James Rennie who is also credited with having written those volumes in The Menageries series entitled Quadrupeds, although Rennie himself left clear indication he was not their author: cf. Rennie, Alphabet of Zoology for the Use of Beginners, Orr & Smith, 1833, pp. 111 and 115, and, respectively, Quadrupeds Vol. I (1829), p. 170, and Quadrupeds Vol. II (1831), p. 69. This invites the question of whether either of the latter books was the work of Ogilby, who also contributed anonymously and probably extensively to the same publisher's Penny Cyclopedia of 1833 (as revealed by a footnote in Magazine of Natural History, new series Vol. I, 1837, p. 452, and by J. E. Gray, List of Specimens of Mammalia in the Collection of the British Museum, 1843, p. 159).)

Despite some initial support for an order of mammals defined by possession of hands, Ogilby's proposal soon attracted objection (Note: See, for example, W. C. L. Martin who, in A General Introduction to the Natural History of Mammiferous Animals with a particular view of the Physical History of Man and the more closely allied genera of the order Quadrumana or Monkeys (London, 1841), p. 203, protested that "the paw of the lion, the paddle of the dolphin and the foot of the squirrel exhibit only modifications of the human hand; yet we do not call them hands; so the graspers of the monkey are modifications of the human hand, adapted for arboreal habits and therefore more prehensile than is the paw of the lion; but they are not on that account to be considered as hands".) – quickened in part, no doubt, by aversion to the proximate relationship between man and ape which it implied. He had anticipated opposition, observing that whereas "the metaphysician or the divine may consider man apart from the animal kingdom, the naturalist must view him in a different light: anatomical structure and organic conformation are the only principles which the zoologist can admit as the foundations of natural science... Man is too closely connected with the apes to admit of being placed widely apart from them".

Sympathy for Ogilby's order of cheiropoda waned. By 1863 the proposal to classify mammals by reference to thumbs alone was considered eccentric and "has, as might have been expected, never been adopted".

== Nomenclature argument ==
In 1833 Ogilby became a member of the Natural History Committee of the recently formed British Association for the Advancement of Science and in 1842 he was appointed one of eight original members of the Association's working party to consider if rules could be devised to govern zoological nomenclature on a uniform and permanent basis. The other such members were Charles Darwin, Hugh Strickland, John Stevens Henslow, Leonard Jenyns, John Westwood, John Richardson and John Phillips; further members were subsequently co-opted.

When praising Ogilby's "Power of the Thumb" thesis in the pages of the Magazine of Natural History, Strickland had disagreed with some of its nomenclature. Ogilby responded in immoderate language, denouncing the alternatives proposed by Strickland as arbitrary, dogmatical, unfounded and unnecessary, whereupon Westwood entered the argument in favour of Strickland. Despite this unpromising backdrop, the Science Association's working party found considerable common ground. A first draft of a regulatory code prepared by Strickland was circulated in February 1842, Darwin marking it with his comments and forwarding it to Ogilby (both men's manuscript observations survive).

The draft was then discussed and revised in meetings attended by Ogilby in April and May, and a second draft was printed for presentation at the Association's annual assembly at Manchester in June. The very existence of the working party attracted hostility at the assembly, notably from J. E. Gray, Keeper of Zoology at the British Museum, with whom Ogilby had a history of bickering over nomenclature. (Note: See, for example, Annals of Natural History, or Magazine of Zoology, Botany and Geology, Vol. I, R. & J. E. Taylor, London, 1838, pp. 216–221 and 293–297.) As a result, Strickland's draft was not adopted in Manchester but, after further revision to reflect comment by members of the working party, was included in the group's report which was printed in the Science Association's Proceedings.

These "Strickland Rules" included provision for the name of a species to be changed if, as applied to the object or group which it represented, its meaning transpired to be "false". Ogilby opposed such flexibility, believing that, once established, the name must remain constant although its application could change by convention. Words, he said, were no more than the expression of an idea and so long as there was agreement on the idea the original or literal meaning of the words encapsulating it had no importance.

He, alone among the first members of the working party, declined to sign the report, but the rules which it promulgated attracted immediate international interest, were reprinted in French and Italian and recommended by foreign zoological societies to be followed by their members. They were the first attempt at an international code governing language in any science, and to them every modern code, whether botanical or zoological, can trace its direct ancestry.

== Residence in Ireland ==
Ogilby inherited his father's Donagheady estate in 1845 just as the Great Famine was beginning to devastate Ireland. In December of the following year he tendered his resignation as Secretary of the Zoological Society, explaining that circumstances required his presence on the estate where "I am myself giving daily employment to from thirty to forty heads of families to keep them from actual starvation". Once established there he became a member of the local Relief Committee and obtained a loan of £6,000 from the Commission of Public Works in order to reclaim parts of his land for agricultural purposes. Reclamation activity enabled him to employ daily between 300 and 400 hands representing, he thought, "from 1,500 to 2,000 human beings who would otherwise have starved or been thrown on the rates". By 1860 he was said to have transformed "wild and mountainous-looking country into one of the finest estates to be seen".

Although he largely disappeared from the view of fellow zoologists (in 1855 Edward Blyth wrote to Darwin asking "What has become of Ogilby?"), his interest in natural history continued. He was elected a member of the Royal Irish Academy in 1849 and of the Natural History Society of Dublin in 1862. When, in 1852, the Science Association held its annual assembly in Belfast, he was President of its Zoological Section and read a paper "On the Geographical Distribution of Animals in Connexion with the Progress of Civilization". In 1857 he attended the Association's meeting in Dublin, delivering a paper of similar theme, and in 1862 he submitted his paper "On the Eccentricity of the Earth and the Method of finding the Coordinates of its Centre of Gravity" to the Association's meeting in Cambridge.

In 1830 he had married Matilda Doria, a daughter of Niccolo Doria, Marquese di Spineto, a Neapolitan refugee who had established himself as a teacher of Italian at Cambridge and acted as interpreter at the trial of Queen Caroline. In 1836 Ogilby named a particularly beautiful species of antelope (Antilope doria) in his wife's honour.

When he took up residence in Ireland his wife initially remained at their house in London's Hanover Terrace while suitable accommodation was built for them on the Irish estate. Following the death of her father in September 1849, she joined her husband in a rented property at Buncrana but died there a month later, aged 40. There were no children of the marriage.

A little over a year later, Ogilby remarried. His second wife, Adelaide Douglas, was a daughter of the local Rector at Donagheady, a niece of the Earl of Morton and a cousin of the Marquess of Abercorn. For the next twenty years Ogilby led the life of a resident Irish squire. He was commissioned a captain in the Royal Tyrone Militia in 1851, served as High Sheriff of County Tyrone in 1852 and enlarged his landholdings by purchase of a further 2,900 acres near Omagh for £30,500 in 1853. A county magistrate by 1854, he was appointed a Deputy Lieutenant in 1863.

In the 1860s he considerably enlarged Liscleen Lodge, the house he had first built on his estate, transforming it to become Altnachree otherwise Altinaghree Castle. This extravagant structure, built with cut stone brought from Dungiven, resembled a castellated factory but became, albeit briefly, an attractive entertainment destination for fashionable Irish society.

For some years Ogilby and his family seemed well settled in County Tyrone. He lectured to the Omagh Literary Society, served as President of the Donagheady and Leckpatrick Farming Society, ran a successful home farm, won prizes for his short-horned cattle in National and Ulster shows, and engaged in extensive tree-planting. His plantation of deodars, covering 11 acres, was said to be the largest in Europe. (Note: He had planted these in 1844, before inheriting Altnachree, having raised them from Himalayan seed: Freeman's Journal, 24 May 1844, quoting Gardener's Chronicle.) However, in 1872 he discontinued farming and relocated his family to Dublin for the benefit of his children's education.

== Astronomy, faith and death ==
Latterly he gave his attention to astronomical matters. In 1868 he delivered a paper "On the Motions of the Moon" to the Royal Irish Academy, and in 1872 he published A New Theory of the Figure of the Earth in which he declared that, in pre-spheroidal form, the planets "revolved in their orbits for countless ages before they began to rotate normally about their axes".

In A New Theory he confirmed his belief in a divine creator of life, damning the "ignorant attempts which have been made to substitute a godless Pantheism for both natural and revealed religion; to dissociate the universe from its Creator, and resuscitate the defunct Goddess of Reason which the indignation of outraged society dethroned and buried some eighty years ago". He regarded the capacity for species to evolve as testament to the "work of creation being complete and perfect in all its parts", the Creator intending that all forms of life should develop as necessary to perpetuate themselves "without any resort to immaculate creations afterwards". He believed that humankind, unlike the beasts that perish, had been made "the proud heir of immortality" according to the "inscrutable wisdom of creation".

He died at his Dublin home, 12 Earlsfort Terrace, on 1 September 1873.

== Children ==
Ogilby was, by his second wife, the father of four sons (two of whom died in infancy) and five daughters. Of the surviving sons, Claud Ogilby (1851–94), led a life that moved from early promise to dissolute maturity. He abandoned Altinaghree Castle, which by 1894 was ruinous, and ended his days in a rented room in a public house at Donemana.

The younger son, James Douglas Ogilby (1853–1925), was a noted athlete. He was 100-yards victor (twice in 10.2 seconds) in the Irish national championships in each of the four years 1874–77, and he invariably won over that distance in competition with the English champions. He is said to have been, in his day, "the most successful amateur sprinter in the world" and also to have been unequalled in Ireland as a swimmer and diver. He originally studied ornithology but subsequently specialised in ichthyology, emigrating to Australia in 1884.

== Publications ==
- "On the Characters and Description of a new Genus of Carnivora, called Cynictis", Transactions of the Zoological Society of London, Vol. I, 1835, pp. 29–34
- "Observations on the Opposable Power of the Thumb in certain Mammals, considered as a zoological character; and of the Natural Affinities which subsist between the Bimana, Quadrumana and Pedimana", The Magazine of Natural History and Journal of Zoology, Botany, Mineralogy, Geology and Meteorology, Vol. I (new series), Longman, Orme, Brown, Green and Longmans, London, 1837, pp. 449–459 and 517–525
- Natural History of the Monkeys, Opossums and Lemurs, Vol. I, Charles Knight, London, 1838
- "Observations on the History and Classification of the Marsupial Quadrupeds of New Holland", The Magazine of Natural History, Vol. III (new series), Longman, Orme, Brown, Green and Longmans, 1839, pp. 130–137, 257–265 and 338–347
- "Memoir on the Mammalogy of the Himalayas" in J. Forbes Royle's Illustrations of the Botany and Other Branches of the Natural History of the Himalayan Mountains and of the Flora of the Cashmere, Wm. H. Allen, London, 1839, pp. lvi–lxxiv
- "Notice of Certain Australian Quadrupeds, belonging to the Order Rodentia", Transactions of the Linnean Society of London, Vol. XVIII, 1841, pp. 121–132
- "Monograph of the Hollow-horned Ruminants", Transactions of the Zoological Society of London, Vol. III, 1849, pp. 33–67

== Notes ==
| Preceded by William Yarrell | Secretary of the Zoological Society of London; 1839–1846 | Succeeded by David William Mitchell |
