= London Scottish (regiment) =

A (The London Scottish) Company
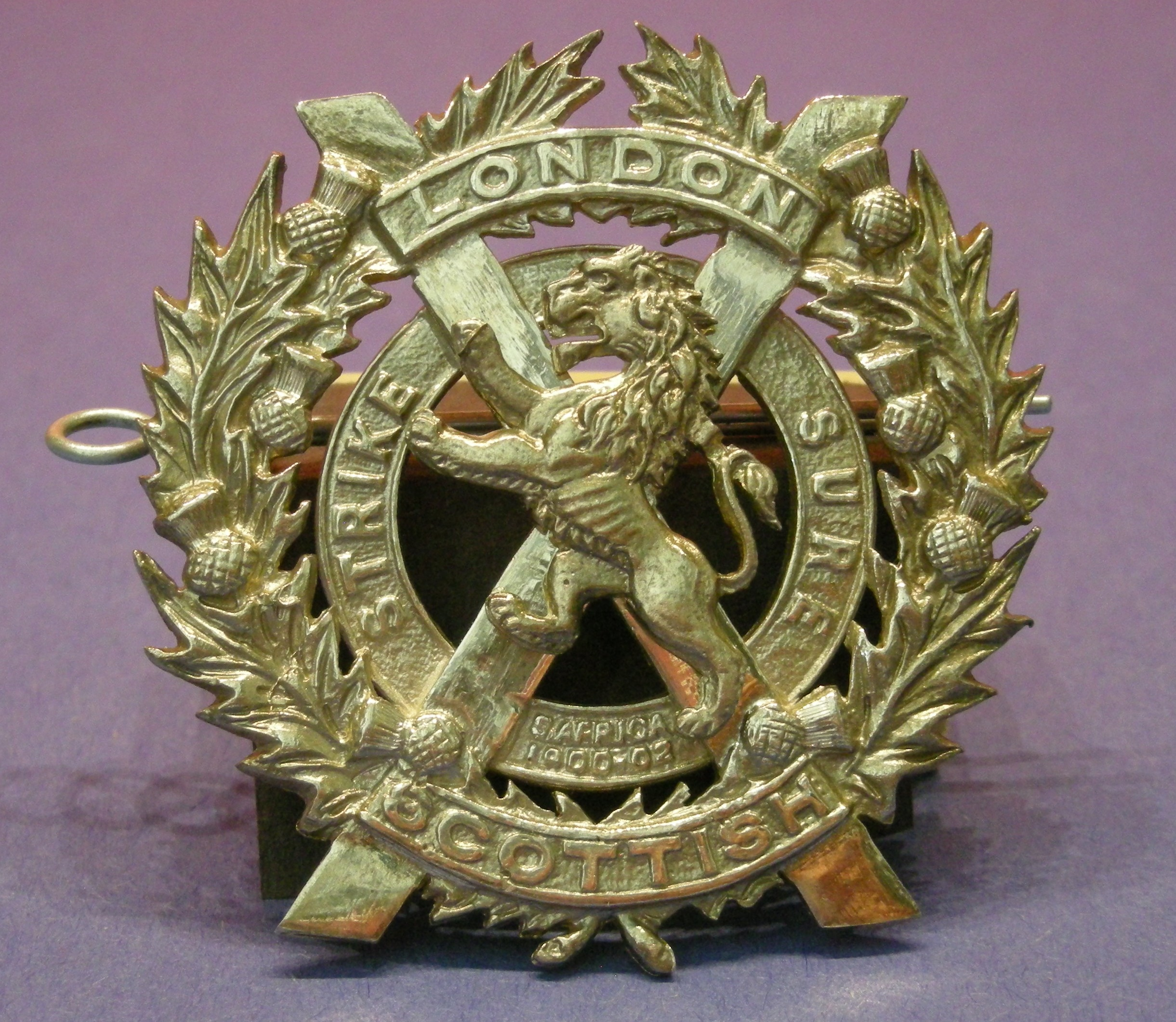
- Cap Badge of the London Scottish
- Active: 1859–1919; 1920–2022
- Country: United Kingdom
- Branch: Army Reserve
- Type: Infantry
- Role: Light infantry
- Size: One company
- Part of: London Regiment
- Garrison/HQ: 59 Buckingham Gate (1886–1985); Horseferry Road drill hall (1985–2017); 76D Rochester Row (2017–present)
- Nickname: Cockney Jocks (Piccadilly Allsorts) (Duke of Bangkok's Rifles)
- Motto: Strike Sure
- March: Highland Laddie
- Anniversaries: 31 October 1914. First TA unit into action in WWI, Messines Ridge, 1st Battle of Ypres

Commanders
- Honorary Regimental Colonel: Lord Geidt GCB GCVO OBE QSO PC
- Colonel of the Regiment: Air Vice-Marshal Ranald Torquil Ian Munro CBE TD VR

Insignia
- Tartan: Hodden Grey

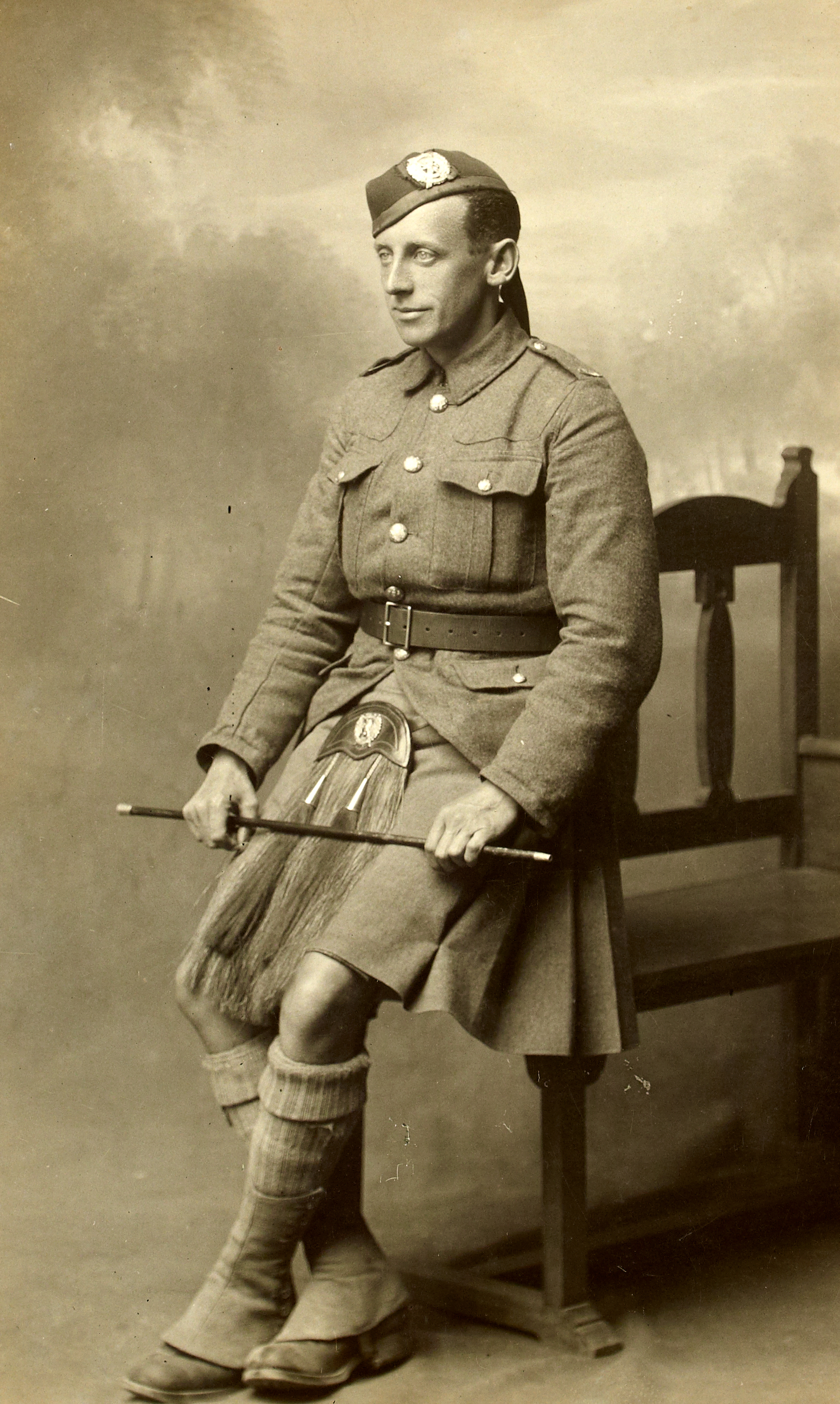
Unknown U.K. Soldier 1921 (London Scottish)

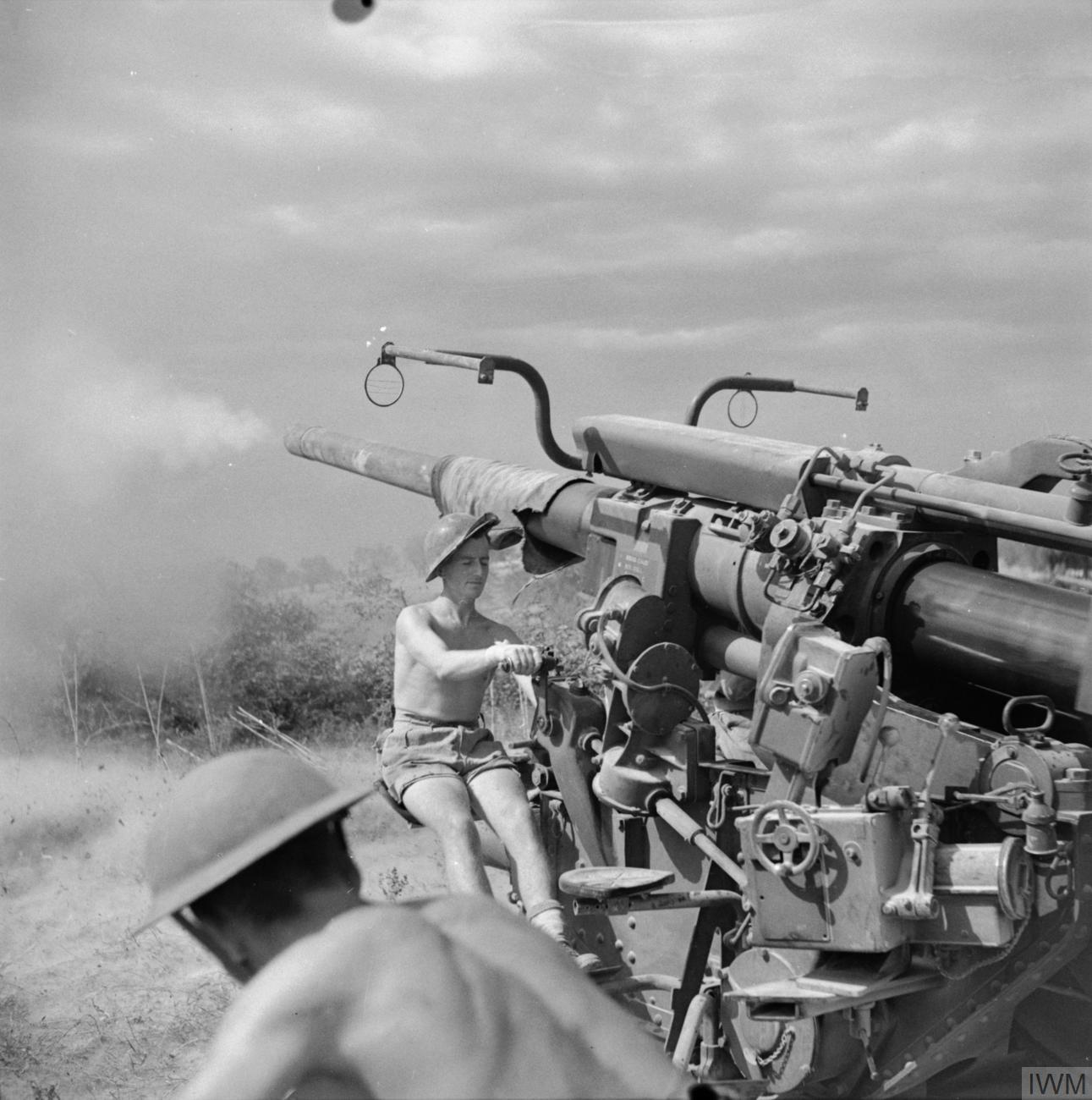
97th (London Scottish) Heavy Anti-Aircraft Regiment, Royal Artillery in Italy, 1944 (IWM NA18197)

The London Scottish was a reserve infantry regiment then a company of the British Army. In its final incarnation, it was A (The London Scottish) Company, the London Regiment until, on 1 May 2022, soldiers in the company transferred to foot guards regiments and the company became G (Messines) Company, Scots Guards, 1st Battalion London Guards.

== History ==
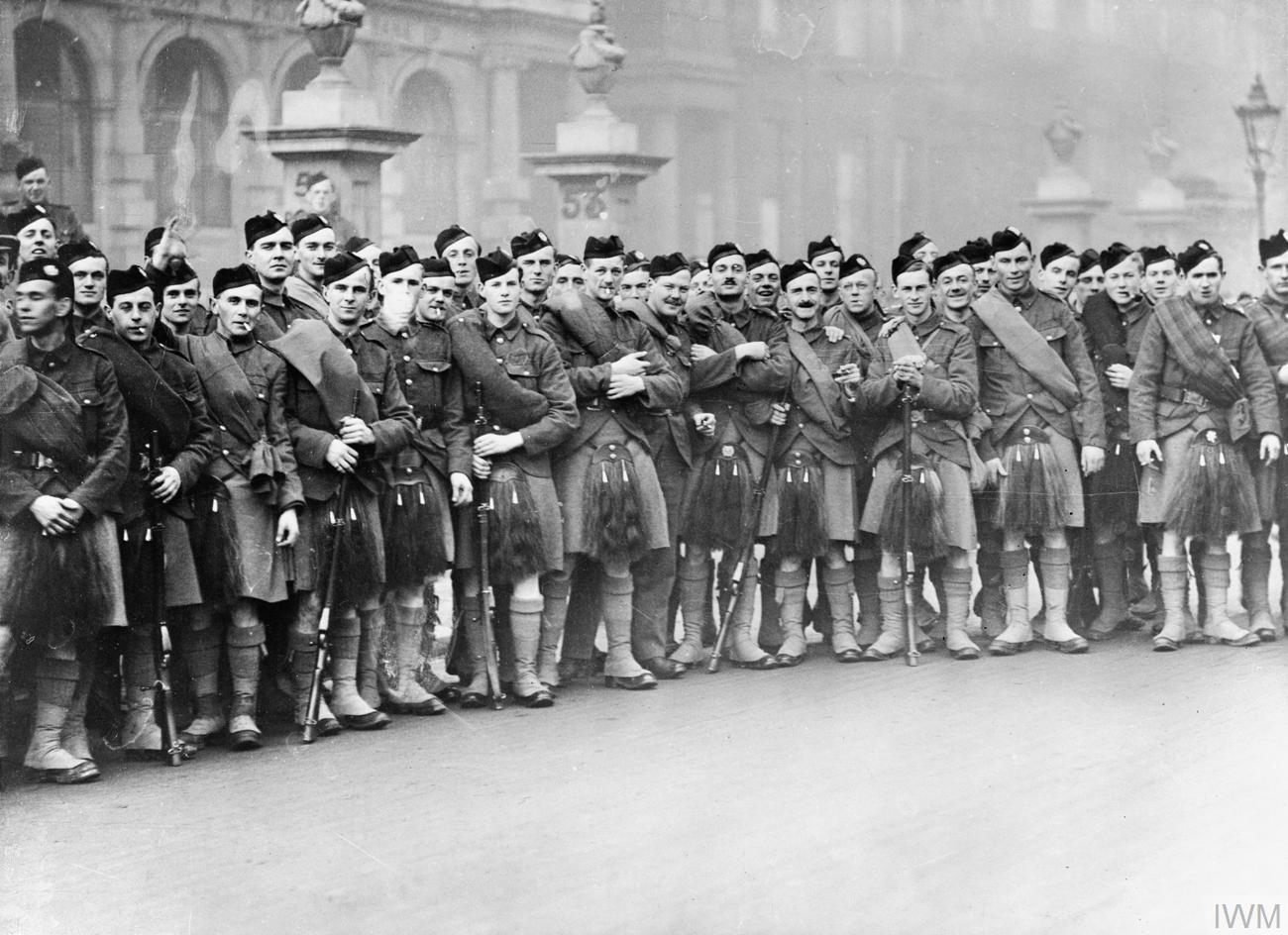
The London Scottish during the First World War, 1914

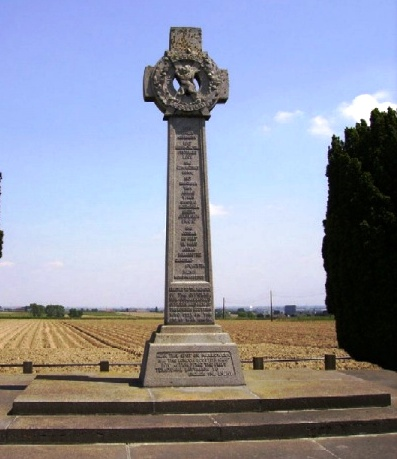
Messines Memorial

=== Formation ===
The regiment was founded on the formation of the Volunteer Force in 1859. Originally as part of the Volunteer Force sponsored by the Highland Society of London and the Caledonian Society of London, a group of individual Scots raised the London Scottish Rifle Volunteers under the command of Lt Col Lord Elcho, later The Earl of Wemyss and March. The regiment became the 7th (London Scottish) Middlesex Volunteer Rifle Corps and then, in 1908, the 14th (County of London) Battalion, London Regiment (London Scottish).

=== First World War ===
The 1/14th Battalion was mobilized on the outbreak of war, departing for France on 15 September 1914. On 31 October 1914, the battalion encountered German forces at Messines in Belgium, the first territorial unit to do so – a memorial stands on the site. The 2/14th Battalion embarked for France in June 1916 but was then transferred to Salonika and Palestine.

=== Inter-war ===
In 1937, on the break-up of the London Regiment, the unit was re-named The London Scottish, The Gordon Highlanders.

=== Second World War ===
The London Scottish raised three battalions during the Second World War, two of which served overseas. Both of the overseas battalions served with the Middle Eastern Forces in Sicily and Italy. The battalions were:

==== 1st Battalion ====
The peacetime battalion of the regiment, served as infantry within the 168th (London) Infantry Brigade (alongside the 1st London Irish Rifles and 10th Royal Berkshire Regiment), part of the 56th (London) Infantry Division (nicknamed "The Black Cats"), playing a significant part in the Italian Campaign, fighting in the Allied invasion of Sicily, fighting at Monte Cassino, Battle of Anzio, Gothic Line (afterwards transferred to 167th (London) Infantry Brigade) and Operation Grapeshot, the final offensive in Italy in 1945.

==== 2nd Battalion ====
Raised as a 'duplicate' of the 1st Battalion, with a core of officers and senior NCOs from that battalion. The battalion initially served in the 141st (London) Infantry Brigade, 47th (London) Infantry Division.

==== 3rd Battalion ====
When the duplicate battalion was formed in April 1939, the regiment had enough recruits to form a third battalion; permission was granted provided it was formed as an anti-aircraft (AA) regiment of the Royal Artillery. It was designated 97th (The London Scottish) Heavy Anti-Aircraft Regiment, RA and formed with HQ and two batteries (298 and 299) at Westminster. It served in 1st AA Division (the old 47th (2nd London) Division) defending London during the Battle of Britain and the Blitz. In March 1943, it left for North Africa where it joined British Eighth Army, and served with it in the Allied invasion of Sicily and Italian Campaign. With the depletion of the Luftwaffe and the reduced requirement for AA defences, it was converted in November 1944 into 97th (London Scottish) Garrison Regiment, RA, later designated 610 Infantry Regiment, RA. When the TA was reconstituted in 1947, 610 Regiment was reformed as 497th (London) Heavy Anti-Aircraft Regiment, RA at Hammersmith, later renamed 497th (Hammersmith) Heavy Anti-Aircraft Regiment, RA, without any London Scottish connection.

=== Post-war ===
In 1967, the London Scottish tradition was resurrected on the formation of G (London Scottish) Company, 1st Battalion 51st Highland Volunteers. From 1992, the tradition was carried on by A (London Scottish) Company of the London Regiment (1993), which provided Reserves for the Foot Guards.

== London Scottish Cadet Corps ==
The London Scottish Cadet Corps, which was formed around 1902, had three companies, a pipe band and its own colours and was sponsored by the regiment. The corps evolved to become 235 Westminster Detachment (London Scottish Regiment), part of 23 Company Middlesex and North West London Army Cadet Force: it is based at the Rochester Row Army Reserve Centre in Westminster and alongside 102 (Bromley), and 95 (Eltham) detachments (Part of South East London Army Cadet Force) are the sole surviving cadet units maintaining the traditions of the regiment.

== Uniforms ==
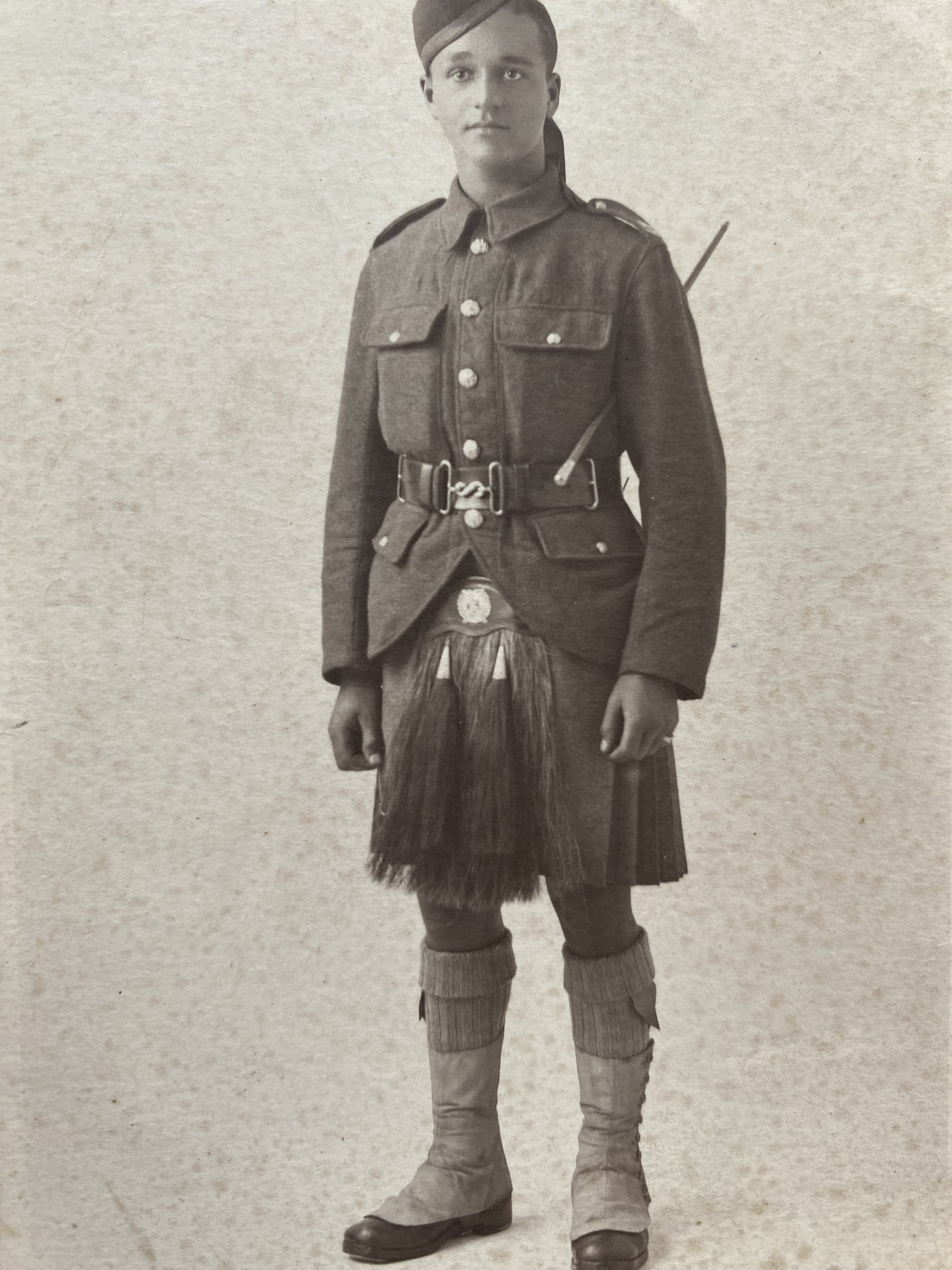
Private Ernest Lockwood (1899–1980), 1917

From its establishment in 1859 The London Scottish wore Hodden Grey uniforms with dark blue facings. This unique colour remained as full dress for the entire regiment until 1914 and survives in the modern kilts and mess dress.

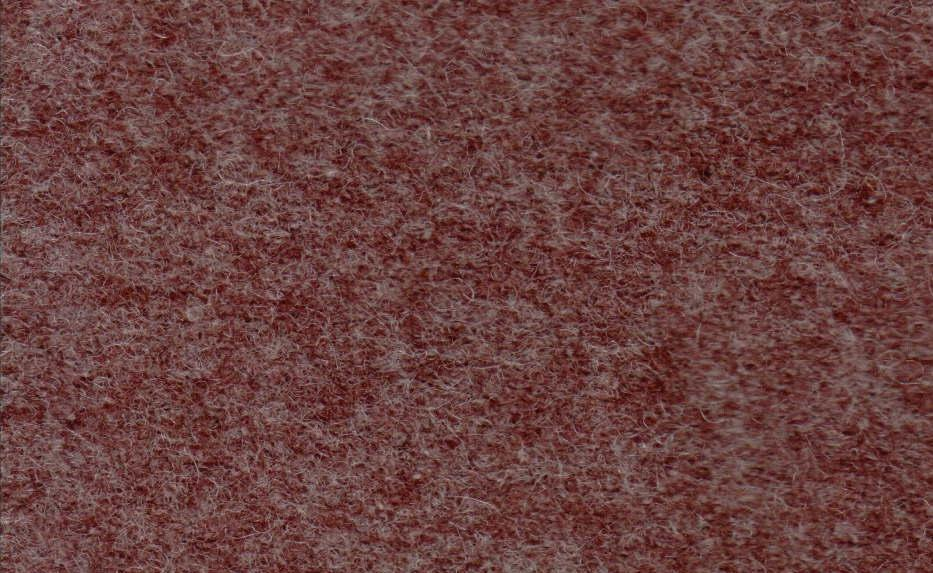
Hodden Grey

== Regimental Pipes and Drums ==
Regimental Drum

Being founded right after the regiment was raised, the Regimental Pipes and Drums of The London Scottish is one of the oldest army pipe bands in the world. It wears its distinctive Hodden Grey tartan maintaining the traditions of the original London Scottish. The pipes and drums accompany the entire regiment during official dinners, military parades, presentation of colours and other regimental functions, effectively providing musical support. It has performed at many high profile events in the City of London as well as Greater London, most notably the Beating Retreat, Lord Mayor's Show and The Royal Caledonian Ball. Outside of the United Kingdom, the band has had the opportunity to perform at many parades and military tattoos in countries such as Germany, Italy, Switzerland, Uzbekistan and Jamaica.

From 1953 to 2002, the Pipe Major of the London Scottish held the position of Piper to the Queen Mother.

== Alliances ==
- Canada – The Toronto Scottish Regiment (Queen Elizabeth The Queen Mother's Own)

== Victoria Crosses ==
Three members of the regiment were awarded the Victoria Cross:

- Charles William Train; Palestine, 1917.
- Robert Edward Cruickshank; Palestine, 1918.
- George Allan Mitchell; Italy, 1944.

== Commanders ==
- 1859–1876: Lieutenant-Colonel Lord Elcho
- 1894–1902: Lieutenant-Colonel Eustace Balfour
- 1902– ? : Lieutenant-Colonel W. E. Edmonstone Montgomerie

== Memorials ==
The unit's First World War and Second World War memorials are located in the Drill Hall at London Scottish House, 95 Horseferry Road in Westminster. The London Scottish Regimental Chapel was dedicated in 1956 as part of St Columba's Church, Pont Street.

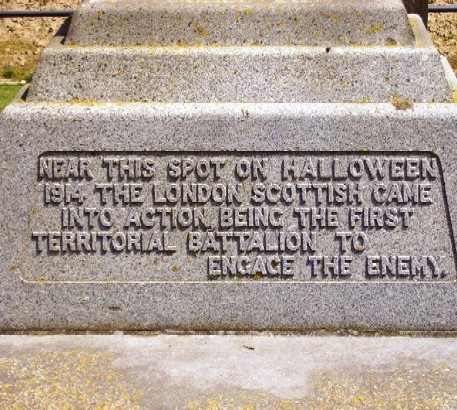
Detail of the Messines memorial

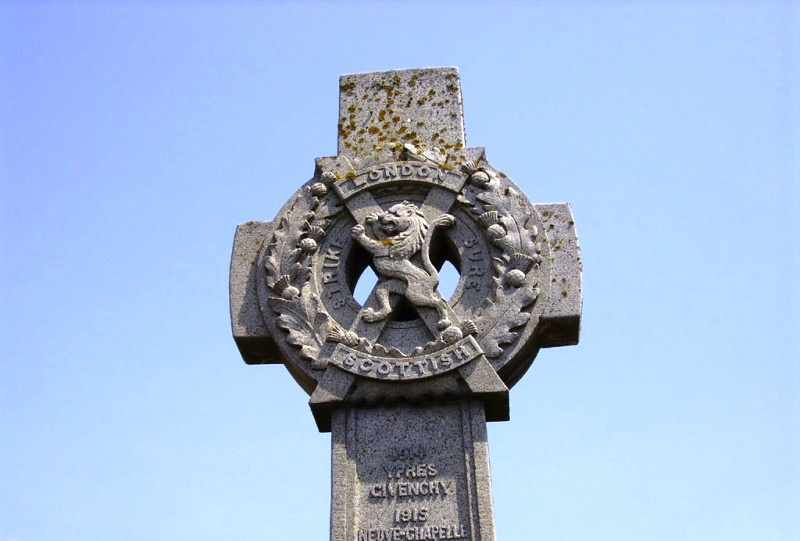
Detail of the Messines memorial

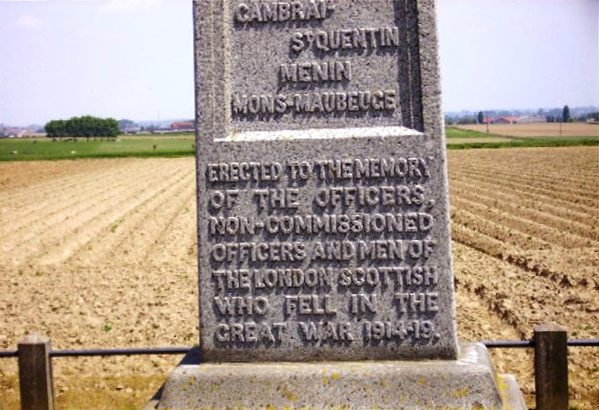
Detail of the Messines memorial

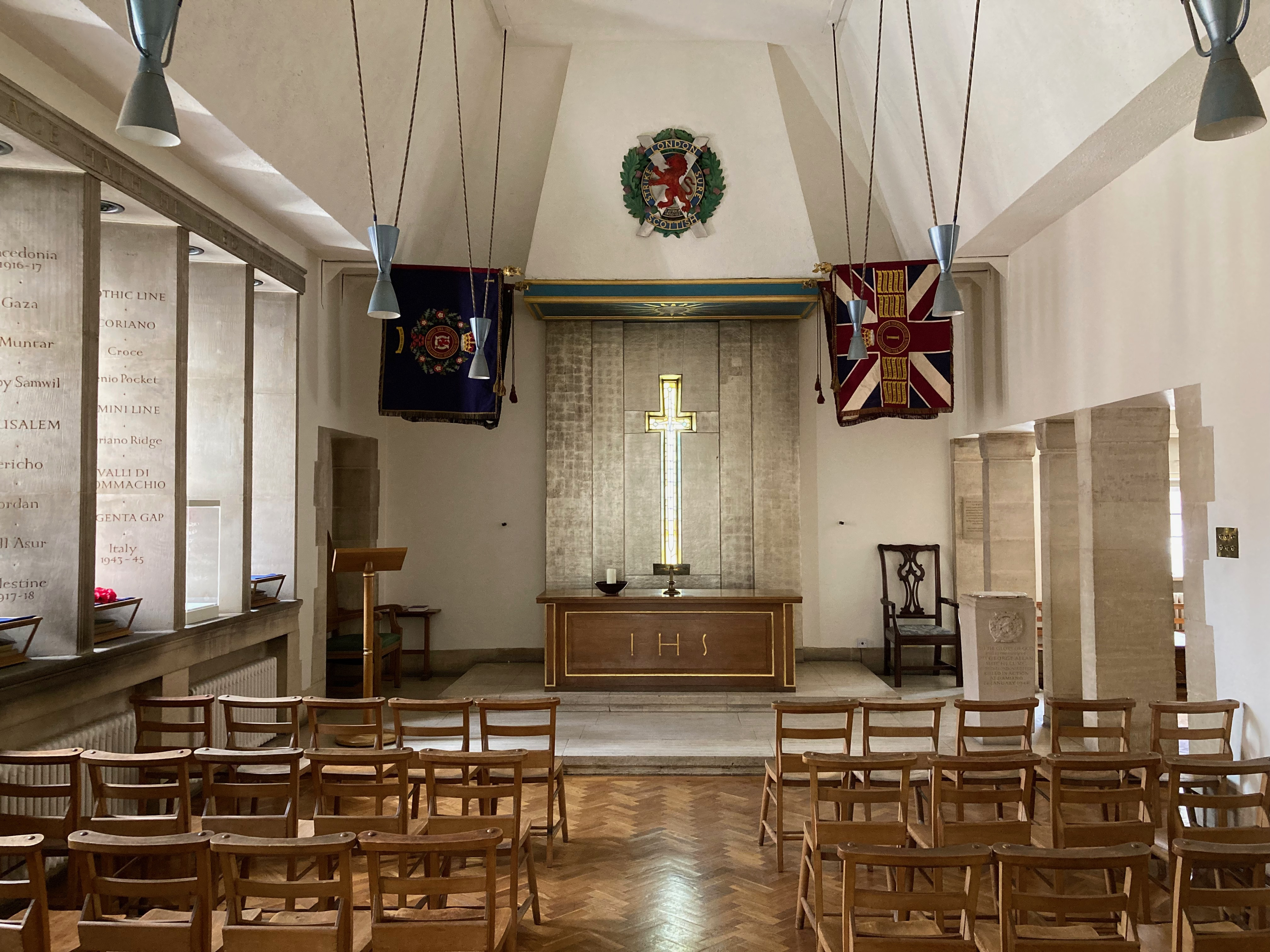
London Scottish Regimental Chapel, St Columba's Church

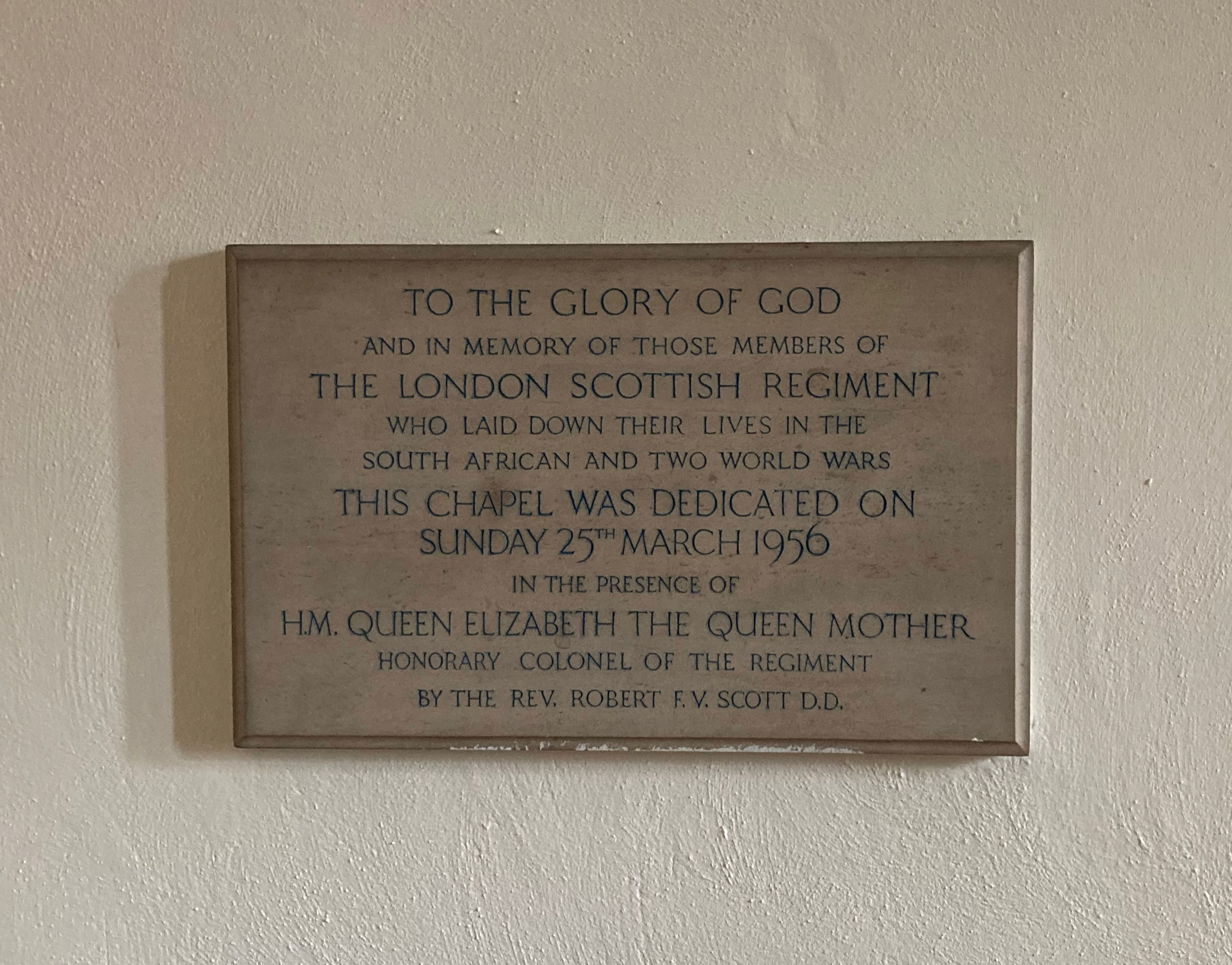
Chapel dedication plaque

== Gallery ==
Lord Elcho

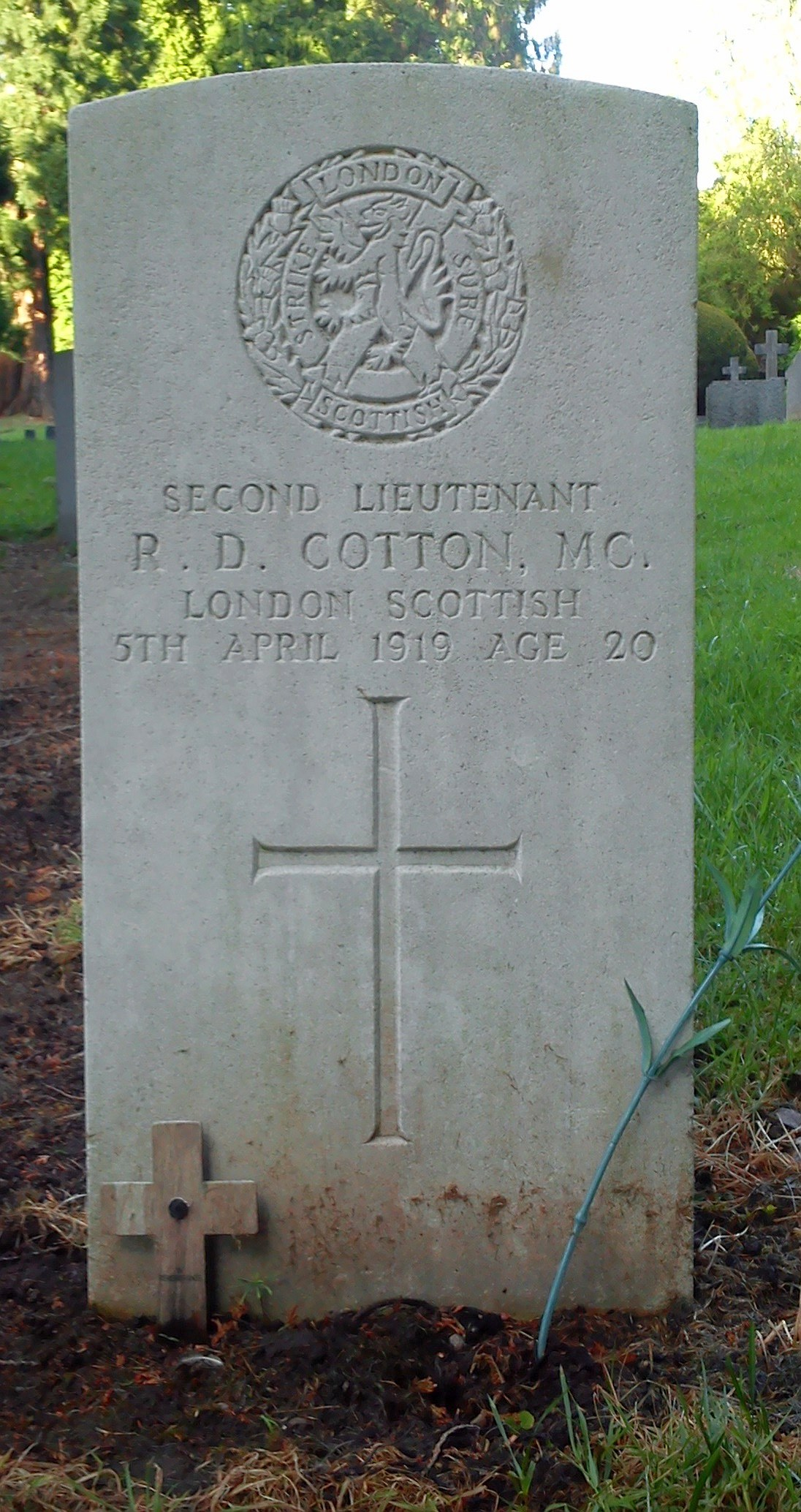
Bromsgrove Cemetery, gravestone of 2nd Lieutenant R.D. Cotton MC

== Sources ==
- Joslen, H. F. (2003) [1960]. Orders of Battle: Second World War, 1939–1945. Uckfield, East Sussex: Naval and Military Press. ISBN 978-1-84342-474-1.
