= David Ogilby =

David Ogilby may refer to:

- David Ogilby (footballer) (born 1984), Northern Irish footballer
- David Ogilby (soldier) (?1755–1834), Irish-born army officer
