= Horseferry Road drill hall =

Military building in Westminster, London, England

- London
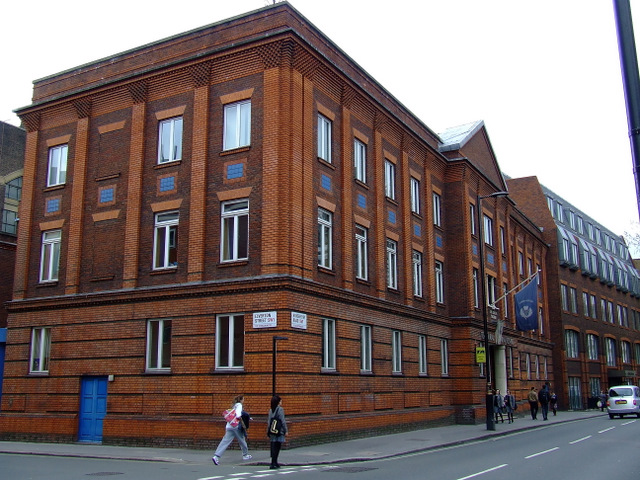
- Horseferry Road drill hall

Site information
- Type: Drill halls

Location
- Location within London
- Coordinates: 51.49527°N 0.13324°W

Site history
- Built: 1985
- Built for: Ministry of Defence
- In use: 1985-Present

The Horseferry Road drill hall was a military installation at 95 Horseferry Road, London.

== History ==
The drill hall was erected on the former site of the Industrial Museum. It was designed as the drill hall for G (London Scottish) Company 1st Battalion 51st Highland Volunteers and was completed in 1985. It incorporates parts the company's previous drill hall at 59 Buckingham Gate, including the wrought iron roof, the double-level iron galleries and the war memorials, which were all relocated.

Prior to their move to 76D Rochester Row, it was the home of A (London Scottish) Company of the London Regiment. It is a Grade II listed building. The London Scottish Regiment Museum holds a collection of regimental memorabilia which it displays on the galleries.
