= Mayigriphus =

Mayigriphus Temporal range: Late Miocene, 12–10 Ma

Scientific classification
- Kingdom: Animalia
- Phylum: Chordata
- Class: Mammalia
- Infraclass: Marsupialia
- Order: Dasyuromorphia
- Family: Dasyuridae
- Genus: †Mayigriphus
- Species: †M. orbus

Binomial name
- †Mayigriphus orbus Wroe, 1997

Extinct species of marsupial

Mayigriphus (lit. 'puzzling tooth') is an extinct genus of dasyurid marsupial known from the Late Miocene rocks of the Riversleigh World Heritage Area of Australia. The genus contains a single species, Mayigriphus orbus, known from two partial dentaries (lower jaw bones), both of which preserve teeth. It is likely closely related to planigales and dunnarts.

== Discovery and naming ==
Mayigriphus is known from two specimens: the holotype QM F23780, consisting of an incomplete right dentary, and the paratype QM F22791, a dentary fragment. Both specimens were collected at Encore Site of the Riversleigh World Heritage Area, in the Boodjamulla National Park, north-western Queensland.

In 1997, Stephen Wroe described Mayigriphus orbus as a new genus and species of dasyuromorphian based on these remains. The genus name combines the Waanyi word "mayi", meaning tooth, with the Latin word "griphus", meaning puzzle. This name was chosen to allude to the enigmatic combination of dental features. The species name "orbus" is a Latin word meaning orphan, referencing the uncertain phylogenetic position of this species.

== Description ==
Mayigriphus was a small-sized dasyurid, with an estimated body mass of 20.6 grams (0.7 oz).

The holotype dentary of Mayigriphus is missing its anterior (front) and posterior (back) ends. It preserves several teeth, including the anterior alveolus and posterior root of the first premolar, the second and third premolars, and all four molars. The first premolar is very small, resulting in the shortening of the premolar row. The second premolar is the largest premolar, both in terms of height and length. Despite its reduced size, the third premolar still possesses two roots. No diastema is present between any of the premolars. All of the lower molars have reduced metaconid cusps and metacristid ridges. The protoconid cusps are located more lingually (towards the tongue) and are recurved. In contrast to other dasyurids, the cristid obliqua ends more anterolingually (towards the front of the tooth and on the side of the tongue), with the crest coming to an end beneath the metacristid notch on the third molar. A small entoconid is present on all lower molars, except for the fourth.

== Classification ==
Because Mayigriphus is based on fragmentary material, its affinities are uncertain. In its description in 1997, Wroe noted certain similarities between Mayigriphus and the dasyurid Planigale, such as a greatly reduced paraconid that is concurrent with a moderately reduced metaconid on the first lower molar and the metaconids of the lower molar series uniformly decrease in size, but did not assign Mayigriphus to any family, placing it as Dasyuromorphia incertae sedis. Churchill and colleagues performed two phylogenetic analyses in 2026 using a modified version of the data matrix of Churchill et al. (2026). The parsimony analysis recovered Mayigriphus as the earliest diverging member of the subfamily Sminthopsinae, while the Bayesian analysis placed it as the second most plesiomorphic dasyurid after Miyumba. These results are displayed in the cladograms below. ⊞ symbols can be clicked to expand nodes.

Topology A: maximum parsimony tree

- Dasyuromorphia
  - †Thylacinidae
  - - Myrmecobiidae
    - - †Mutpuracinus archibaldi
      - - †Malleodectidae
        - - †Joculusium muizoni
          - Dasyuridae
            - †Miyumba chrisdickmani
            - - Sminthopsinae
                - †Mayigriphus orbus
                - - Planigalini
                    ⊞
                    - Planigale maculata
                    - - Planigale ingrami
                      - - †Urrayira whitei
                        - Planigale gilesi
                    ⊟
                  - Sminthopsini
                    ⊞
                    - Ningaui yvonnae
                    - - Sminthopsis murina
                      - - †Sminthopsis floravillensis
                        - - Antechinomys laniger
                          - Sminthopsis crassicaudata
                    ⊟
              - Dasyurinae
                - Phascogalini
                  ⊞
                  - - Antechinus flaviceps
                    - Phascogale tapoatafa
                    - †Antechinus yammal
                    - †Antechinus yuna
                    - Antechinus agilis
                  - - Paramurexia rothschildi
                    - - Murexechinus melanurus
                      - - Murexia longicaudata
                        - - Micromurexia spp.
                          - Phascomurexia naso
                  ⊟
                - Dasyurini
                  ⊞
                  - Myoictis melas
                  - - - Parantechinus apicalis
                      - - Pseudantechinus macdonnellensis
                        - Pseudantechinus bilarni
                      - - Dasykaluta rosamondae
                        - - Dasycercus cristicauda
                          - Dasyuroides byrnei
                          - †Dasyuroides achilpatna
                          - †Dasyurus dunmalli
                    - - - Neophascogale lorentzi
                        - Phascolosorex dorsalis
                      - - Dasyurus spartacus
                        - - Sarcophilus harrisii
                          - - Dasyurus hallucatus
                            - Dasyurus albopunctatus
                            - Dasyurus geoffroii
                            - Dasyurus maculatus
                            - Dasyurus viverrinus
                  ⊟

Topology B: Bayesian total evidence tree

- Dasyuromorphia
  - †Thylacinidae
  - - †Protamalleus stevewroei
    - †Malleodectidae
    - - Myrmecobiidae
      - †Mutpuracinus archibaldi
      - †Tyarrpecinus rothi
      - †Joculusium muizoni
      - Dasyuridae
        - †Miyumba chrisdickmani
        - - †Mayigriphus orbus
          - - Sminthopsinae
              - Planigalini
                ⊞
                - Planigale maculata
                - †Urrayira whitei
                - Planigale gilesi
                - Planigale ingrami
                ⊟
              - Sminthopsini
                ⊞
                - Antechinomys laniger
                - - Ningaui yvonnae
                  - - Sminthopsis crassicaudata
                    - Sminthopsis murina
                    - †Sminthopsis floravillensis
                ⊟
            - Dasyurinae
              - Phascogalini
                ⊞
                - - †Antechinus yuna
                  - - Antechinus flaviceps
                    - - †Antechinus yammal
                      - Antechinus agilis
                - - Phascogale tapoatafa
                  - - - Micromurexia spp.
                      - Paramurexia rothschildi
                    - - Murexechinus melanurus
                      - - Murexia longicaudata
                        - Phascomurexia naso
                ⊟
              - Dasyurini
                ⊞
                - - Pseudantechinus macdonnellensis
                  - Pseudantechinus bilarni
                - - - - Parantechinus apicalis
                      - Myoictis melas
                    - - Dasykaluta rosamondae
                      - - Dasycercus cristicauda
                        - Dasyuroides byrnei
                        - †Dasyuroides achilpatna
                        - †Dasyurus dunmalli
                  - - - Neophascogale lorentzi
                      - Phascolosorex dorsalis
                    - - Sarcophilus harrisii
                      - - Dasyurus hallucatus
                        - - Dasyurus albopunctatus
                          - Dasyurus maculatus
                          - - Dasyurus viverrinus
                            - - Dasyurus geoffroii
                              - Dasyurus spartacus
                ⊟

== Paleobiology ==
Mayigriphus is known from Encore Site at the Riversleigh World Heritage Area, which is interpreted as being part of Riversleigh's Faunal Zone D. It is estimated to be Late Miocene in age, or approximately 12 to 10 million years old, through biocorrelation. The site represents a cave deposit, the original entrance of which appears to have acted as a natural pit-fall trap. Various factors like the high number of arboreal taxa and the abundance of very large taxa suggests that the environment surrounding the cave was open forest. Mayigriphus probably had a similar diet to species of Planigale, eating invertebrates and small vertebrates.

A vast diversity of fauna is known from Encore Site, comprising mammals and other vertebrates. Possums are especially abundant at this locality and are represented by the burramyid Burramys, the phalangerid Trichosurus, and two unnamed pseudocheirids. Other mammals include the dasyuromorphs Ganbulanyi and Malleodectes, the bandicoot Madju, the koala Phascolarctos, the wombat Warendja, the marsupial lion Wakaleo, the diprotodontoids Neohelos and Palorchestes, and the macropods Ekaltadeta and Ganguroo. Other vertebrates include snakes, lizards, birds, and lungfish.
