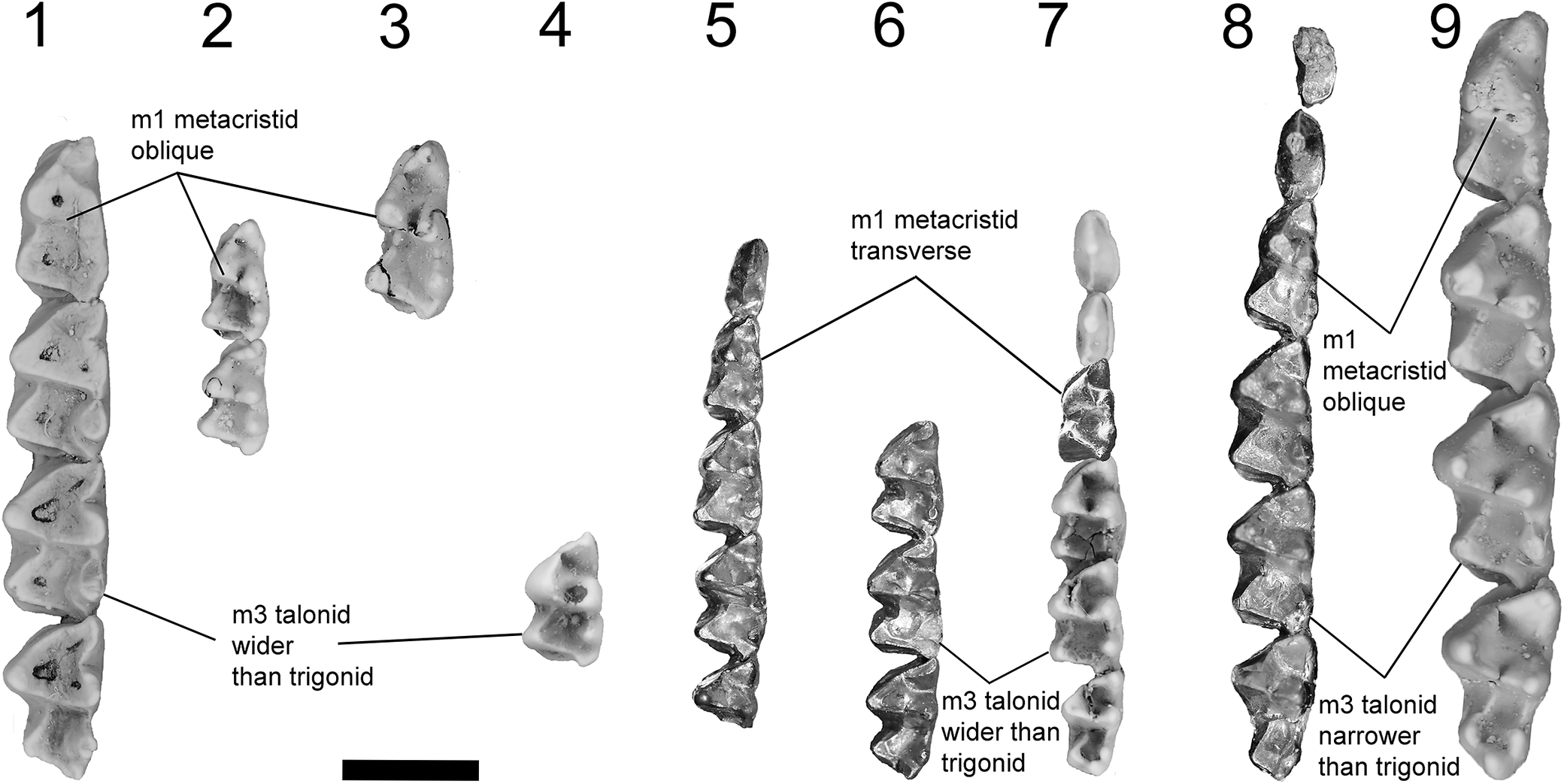
- Lower dentition of Joculusium muizoni (8), compared to all keeunamorphian species (1–7) and Barinya wangala (9)

Scientific classification
- Kingdom: Animalia
- Phylum: Chordata
- Class: Mammalia
- Infraclass: Marsupialia
- Order: Dasyuromorphia
- Genus: †Joculusium
- Species: †J. muizoni

Binomial name
- †Joculusium muizoni Wroe, 2001

= Joculusium =

Joculusium Temporal range: Middle Miocene 15.1–12.9 Ma

Extinct species of marsupial

Joculusium (lit. 'a little joke') is an extinct genus of carnivorous marsupial known from the Middle Miocene rocks of the Riversleigh World Heritage Area of Australia. The genus contains a single species, Joculusium muizoni, known from a partial dentary (lower jaw bone).

== Discovery and naming ==
Location of the Riversleigh World Heritage Area in Queensland

The fossil remains of Joculusium were found at Gag Site of the Riversleigh World Heritage Area, in the Boodjamulla National Park, north-western Queensland. The holotype and only specimen is QM F36442, and consists of an incomplete left dentary.

In 2001, Stephen Wroe described Joculusium muizoni as a new genus and species of dasyuromorphian based on these remains. The genus name is derived from the Latin word joculus, meaning 'a little joke', in reference to the type locality. The species name was chosen to honour the French palaeontologist Christian de Muizon, in recognition of his contributions to the study of fossil marsupials.

== Description ==
Joculusium was a rather small marsupial, with a body mass estimated to be 94.4 grams (3.3 oz) based on tooth size.

The dentary of Joculusium is missing its anterior (front) and posterior (back) ends. It preserves several teeth, including the posterior root of the first premolar, the second and third premolars, and all four molars. A small diastema occurs between the first two premolars. Although incomplete, the second premolar is the longest of the premolars. The third premolar is the same height, if not taller, than the second premolar. The trigonids of all lower molars is shorter in length than the talonids. Additionally, the posterior faces of the trigonids are inclined towards the front of the teeth. A large entoconid is present on the first, second and third molars, but is small yet distinct on the fourth. An anterior cingulid encircles the paraconid on the first molar. The metacristid is almost equal in length to the paracristid on the last three molars. These molars also have a cristid obliqua that ends buccal to the carnassial notch of the metacristid, and a shallow hypoconulid notch on the anterior cingulids.

== Classification ==
In his description of Joculusium, Stephen Wroe placed it within Dasyuromorphia on the basis of several features, particularly the oblique alignment of the metacristid relative to the long axis of the dentary. This feature is also seen in some thylacinids and dasyurids, making its placement at the family level untenable. Churchill and colleagues performed two phylogenetic analyses in 2026 using a modified version of the data matrix of Churchill et al. (2026). The parsimony analysis placed Joculusium as outside and sister taxon to Dasyuridae, while the Bayesian analysis placed it in a polytomy with Tyarrpecinus, Muribacinus, Mutpuracinus, Myrmecobiidae, and Dasyuridae. These results are displayed in the cladograms below. ⊞ symbols can be clicked to expand nodes.

Topology A: maximum parsimony tree

- Dasyuromorphia
  - †Thylacinidae
  - - Myrmecobiidae
    - - †Mutpuracinus archibaldi
      - - †Malleodectidae
        - - †Joculusium muizoni
          - Dasyuridae
            - †Miyumba chrisdickmani
            - - Sminthopsinae
                - †Mayigriphus orbus
                - - Planigalini
                    ⊞
                    - Planigale maculata
                    - - Planigale ingrami
                      - - †Urrayira whitei
                        - Planigale gilesi
                    ⊟
                  - Sminthopsini
                    ⊞
                    - Ningaui yvonnae
                    - - Sminthopsis murina
                      - - †Sminthopsis floravillensis
                        - - Antechinomys laniger
                          - Sminthopsis crassicaudata
                    ⊟
              - Dasyurinae
                - Phascogalini
                  ⊞
                  - - Antechinus flaviceps
                    - Phascogale tapoatafa
                    - †Antechinus yammal
                    - †Antechinus yuna
                    - Antechinus agilis
                  - - Paramurexia rothschildi
                    - - Murexechinus melanurus
                      - - Murexia longicaudata
                        - - Micromurexia spp.
                          - Phascomurexia naso
                  ⊟
                - Dasyurini
                  ⊞
                  - Myoictis melas
                  - - - Parantechinus apicalis
                      - - Pseudantechinus macdonnellensis
                        - Pseudantechinus bilarni
                      - - Dasykaluta rosamondae
                        - - Dasycercus cristicauda
                          - Dasyuroides byrnei
                          - †Dasyuroides achilpatna
                          - †Dasyurus dunmalli
                    - - - Neophascogale lorentzi
                        - Phascolosorex dorsalis
                      - - Dasyurus spartacus
                        - - Sarcophilus harrisii
                          - - Dasyurus hallucatus
                            - Dasyurus albopunctatus
                            - Dasyurus geoffroii
                            - Dasyurus maculatus
                            - Dasyurus viverrinus
                  ⊟

Topology B: Bayesian total evidence tree

- Dasyuromorphia
  - †Thylacinidae
  - - †Protamalleus stevewroei
    - †Malleodectidae
    - - Myrmecobiidae
      - †Mutpuracinus archibaldi
      - †Tyarrpecinus rothi
      - †Joculusium muizoni
      - Dasyuridae
        - †Miyumba chrisdickmani
        - - †Mayigriphus orbus
          - - Sminthopsinae
              - Planigalini
                ⊞
                - Planigale maculata
                - †Urrayira whitei
                - Planigale gilesi
                - Planigale ingrami
                ⊟
              - Sminthopsini
                ⊞
                - Antechinomys laniger
                - - Ningaui yvonnae
                  - - Sminthopsis crassicaudata
                    - Sminthopsis murina
                    - †Sminthopsis floravillensis
                ⊟
            - Dasyurinae
              - Phascogalini
                ⊞
                - - †Antechinus yuna
                  - - Antechinus flaviceps
                    - - †Antechinus yammal
                      - Antechinus agilis
                - - Phascogale tapoatafa
                  - - - Micromurexia spp.
                      - Paramurexia rothschildi
                    - - Murexechinus melanurus
                      - - Murexia longicaudata
                        - Phascomurexia naso
                ⊟
              - Dasyurini
                ⊞
                - - Pseudantechinus macdonnellensis
                  - Pseudantechinus bilarni
                - - - - Parantechinus apicalis
                      - Myoictis melas
                    - - Dasykaluta rosamondae
                      - - Dasycercus cristicauda
                        - Dasyuroides byrnei
                        - †Dasyuroides achilpatna
                        - †Dasyurus dunmalli
                  - - - Neophascogale lorentzi
                      - Phascolosorex dorsalis
                    - - Sarcophilus harrisii
                      - - Dasyurus hallucatus
                        - - Dasyurus albopunctatus
                          - Dasyurus maculatus
                          - - Dasyurus viverrinus
                            - - Dasyurus geoffroii
                              - Dasyurus spartacus
                ⊟

== Paleobiology ==
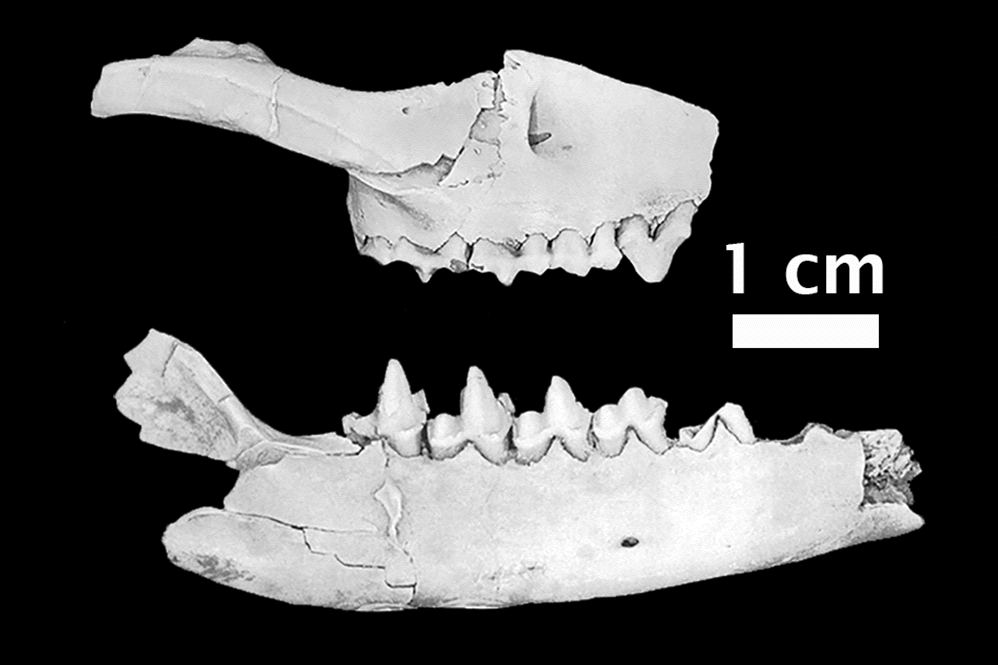
Partial skull of the contemporaneous thylacinid Muribacinus

Joculusium is known from Gag Site at the Riversleigh World Heritage Area, which is interpreted as being part of Riversleigh's Faunal Zone C. Although not directly dated, it is estimated to be approximately ~15.1–12.9 million years old (Ma) through biocorrelation, placing it within the Middle Miocene sub-epoch. Various factors like the high number of arboreal taxa, overall species richness and the presence of certain rainforest taxa suggests that Gag Site was deposited in a rainforest habitat.

A vast diversity of fauna is known from Gag Site, comprising mammals and other vertebrates. Possums are especially abundant at this locality and are represented by the burramyids Burramys and Cercartetus, the petauroid Djaludjangi, the pseudocheirids Paljara and Marlu, and the phalangerids Onirocuscus and "Trichosurus". Other mammals include the thylacinid Muribacinus, the malleodectid Malleodectes, the koala Litokoala, the diprotodontoids Neohelos, Nimbadon and Propalorchestes, the rat kangaroos Hypsiprymnodon and Ekaltadeta, and the macropodids Bulungamaya and Wanburoo. Other vertebrates include birds (such as Emuarius), lizards, snakes, and amphibians.
