= Miyumba =

Miyumba Temporal range: Early Miocene, 18.5–17.7 Ma

Scientific classification
- Kingdom: Animalia
- Phylum: Chordata
- Class: Mammalia
- Infraclass: Marsupialia
- Order: Dasyuromorphia
- Family: Dasyuridae
- Genus: †Miyumba; Churchill et al., 2026
- Species: †M. chrisdickmani

Binomial name
- †Miyumba chrisdickmani Churchill et al., 2026

Extinct genus of marsupial

Miyumba is an extinct genus of dasyurid marsupial known from the Early Miocene rocks of the Riversleigh World Heritage Area of Australia. The genus contains a single species, Miyumba chrisdickmani, known from several partial dentaries (lower jaw bones), all of which preserve teeth. It is one of the basalmost and oldest definitive dasyurids known to date.

== Discovery and naming ==
The remains of Miyumba were uncovered from limestone deposits at the Riversleigh World Heritage Area, in the Boodjamulla National Park, north-western Queensland. The holotype specimen is QM F62121, a left dentary retaining the first three molars from Neville’s Garden Site. Six additional paratype specimens were also assigned to Miyumba, all partial dentaries from the type locality, as well as the Upper and Wayne’s Wok sites.

In 2026, Timothy J. Churchill and colleagues described Miyumba chrisdickmani a new genus and species of dasyurid based on these remains. The generic name is derived from the Waanyi word "miyumba", which describes the land where the Riversleigh World Heritage Area is located. The specific name was chosen to honour Professor Chris Dickman, for his contributions towards dasyurid biology.

== Description ==
Miyumba was similar in body mass to the extant dasyurids Antechinus and Sminthopsis, weighing around 23.3-33.5 grams (0.8-1.2 oz).

The lower jaw is narrow, with two mental foramina situated under the second premolar and first molar respectively. While its incisors have not been preserved, their alveoli indicate that the second and third incisors were of similar size. The canine was large and procumbent, or directed forward, based on the morphology of its tooth socket. Well-developed buccal (cheek) cingulids are present on the premolars and molars. The second premolar is the longest of the premolars, and has a triangular outline when viewed from the side. The third premolar is reduced relative to the second, being approximately the same length as the first. There are no diastema between any of the premolars. The lower molars of Miyumba differ from those of other dasyurids in having unreduced metaconids. In addition, the teeth possess anterior and posterior cingulids, as well as well-developed preentocristids, a ridge that runs from the front of the entoconid. Compared to the second and third molars, the first molar is unreduced. It has an unreduced paraconid that is in front of and slightly lingual (towards the tongue) to the protoconid. The second molar is similar in morphology, although slightly longer and wider. Its paraconid is larger and is positioned closer to the protoconid. The talonid of the third molar is narrower relative to those of the preceding molars. The fourth molar is approximately subequal in length compared to the other molars. Unlike modern dasyurids, its talonid retains three cusps, the hypoconid, hypoconulid and entoconid.

== Classification ==
To test the affinities and relationships of Miyumba, Churchill et al. (2026) ran two phylogenetic analyses using an updated version of the dataset of Churchill et al. (2026). Both analyses recovered Miyumba as the sister taxon to a clade containing all other members of the family Dasyuridae. These results are displayed in the cladograms below. ⊞ symbols can be clicked to expand nodes.

Topology A: maximum parsimony tree

- Dasyuromorphia
  - †Thylacinidae
  - - Myrmecobiidae
    - - †Mutpuracinus archibaldi
      - - †Malleodectidae
        - - †Joculusium muizoni
          - Dasyuridae
            - †Miyumba chrisdickmani
            - - Sminthopsinae
                - †Mayigriphus orbus
                - - Planigalini
                    ⊞
                    - Planigale maculata
                    - - Planigale ingrami
                      - - †Urrayira whitei
                        - Planigale gilesi
                    ⊟
                  - Sminthopsini
                    ⊞
                    - Ningaui yvonnae
                    - - Sminthopsis murina
                      - - †Sminthopsis floravillensis
                        - - Antechinomys laniger
                          - Sminthopsis crassicaudata
                    ⊟
              - Dasyurinae
                - Phascogalini
                  ⊞
                  - - Antechinus flaviceps
                    - Phascogale tapoatafa
                    - †Antechinus yammal
                    - †Antechinus yuna
                    - Antechinus agilis
                  - - Paramurexia rothschildi
                    - - Murexechinus melanurus
                      - - Murexia longicaudata
                        - - Micromurexia spp.
                          - Phascomurexia naso
                  ⊟
                - Dasyurini
                  ⊞
                  - Myoictis melas
                  - - - Parantechinus apicalis
                      - - Pseudantechinus macdonnellensis
                        - Pseudantechinus bilarni
                      - - Dasykaluta rosamondae
                        - - Dasycercus cristicauda
                          - Dasyuroides byrnei
                          - †Dasyuroides achilpatna
                          - †Dasyurus dunmalli
                    - - - Neophascogale lorentzi
                        - Phascolosorex dorsalis
                      - - Dasyurus spartacus
                        - - Sarcophilus harrisii
                          - - Dasyurus hallucatus
                            - Dasyurus albopunctatus
                            - Dasyurus geoffroii
                            - Dasyurus maculatus
                            - Dasyurus viverrinus
                  ⊟

Topology B: Bayesian total evidence tree

- Dasyuromorphia
  - †Thylacinidae
  - - †Protamalleus stevewroei
    - †Malleodectidae
    - - Myrmecobiidae
      - †Mutpuracinus archibaldi
      - †Tyarrpecinus rothi
      - †Joculusium muizoni
      - Dasyuridae
        - †Miyumba chrisdickmani
        - - †Mayigriphus orbus
          - - Sminthopsinae
              - Planigalini
                ⊞
                - Planigale maculata
                - †Urrayira whitei
                - Planigale gilesi
                - Planigale ingrami
                ⊟
              - Sminthopsini
                ⊞
                - Antechinomys laniger
                - - Ningaui yvonnae
                  - - Sminthopsis crassicaudata
                    - Sminthopsis murina
                    - †Sminthopsis floravillensis
                ⊟
            - Dasyurinae
              - Phascogalini
                ⊞
                - - †Antechinus yuna
                  - - Antechinus flaviceps
                    - - †Antechinus yammal
                      - Antechinus agilis
                - - Phascogale tapoatafa
                  - - - Micromurexia spp.
                      - Paramurexia rothschildi
                    - - Murexechinus melanurus
                      - - Murexia longicaudata
                        - Phascomurexia naso
                ⊟
              - Dasyurini
                ⊞
                - - Pseudantechinus macdonnellensis
                  - Pseudantechinus bilarni
                - - - - Parantechinus apicalis
                      - Myoictis melas
                    - - Dasykaluta rosamondae
                      - - Dasycercus cristicauda
                        - Dasyuroides byrnei
                        - †Dasyuroides achilpatna
                        - †Dasyurus dunmalli
                  - - - Neophascogale lorentzi
                      - Phascolosorex dorsalis
                    - - Sarcophilus harrisii
                      - - Dasyurus hallucatus
                        - - Dasyurus albopunctatus
                          - Dasyurus maculatus
                          - - Dasyurus viverrinus
                            - - Dasyurus geoffroii
                              - Dasyurus spartacus
                ⊟

== Paleobiology ==
Miyumba is known from the Neville's Garden, Wayne's Wok and Upper sites at the Riversleigh World Heritage Area, which are interpreted as being part of Riversleigh's Faunal Zone B. Neville's Garden Site has been radiometrically dated as being between 18.51 and 17.97 million years old, while the Wayne's Wok and Upper sites have been determined to be Early Miocene in age via biocorrelation. All three sites represent cave deposits, the original entrances of which appear to have acted as a natural pit-fall trap. Various factors like the high number of arboreal taxa, overall species richness and the presence of certain rainforest taxa suggests that suggests that the environment surrounding the caves was rainforest.

Possums are abundant at all three sites and are represented by the phalangeroid Durudawari, the burramyids Burramys and Cercartetus, the pilkipildrid Djilgaringa, the ektopodontids Chunia and Ektopodon, the phalangerids Gawinga, Marlu and Paljara, and the petauroid Djaludjangi. Other mammals that lived alongside Miyumba include the platypus Obdurodon, the thylacinids Wabulacinus and Nimbacinus, the bandicoot Yarala, the marsupial lions Lekaneleo and Microleo, the koala Nimiokoala, the diprotodontoids Propalorchestes and Neohelos, the rat-kangaroos Hypsiprymnodon and Ekaltadeta, the macropodids Bulunugamaya, Ganguroo, Wabularoo and Wakiewakie, and the enigmatic marsupial Yalkaparidon. Other vertebrates include amphibians, lizards, snakes and birds (such as Emuarius).
