= Tate's three-striped dasyure =

Conservation status
- Data Deficient (IUCN 3.1)

Scientific classification
- Kingdom: Animalia
- Phylum: Chordata
- Class: Mammalia
- Infraclass: Marsupialia
- Order: Dasyuromorphia
- Family: Dasyuridae
- Genus: Myoictis
- Species: M. wavicus

Binomial name
- Myoictis wavicus (Tate, 1947)

Species of marsupial

The Tate's three-striped dasyure (Myoictis wavicus) is a member of the order Dasyuromorphia. This marsupial carnivore lives in New Guinea. It inhabits primary montane forest. Like its congeners, it is thought to be diurnal and largely terrestrial.

Myoictis wavicus was previously considered to be a subspecies of M. melas. It was recently elevated to full species status based on morphological and genetic examinations. It is most closely related to M. leucura.
