= Ganbulanyi =

Ganbulanyi Temporal range: Late Miocene, 12–10 Ma

Scientific classification
- Kingdom: Animalia
- Phylum: Chordata
- Class: Mammalia
- Infraclass: Marsupialia
- Order: Dasyuromorphia
- Genus: †Ganbulanyi; Wroe, 1998
- Species: †G. djadjinguli

Binomial name
- †Ganbulanyi djadjinguli Wroe, 1998

Extinct genus of marsupial

Ganbulanyi (lit. 'native cat') is an extinct genus of dasyurid marsupial known from Late Miocene rocks of the Riversleigh World Heritage Area of Australia. The genus contains a single species, Ganbulanyi djadjinguli, known only from a single molar. Its teeth display adaptations for a durophagous lifestyle.

== Discovery and naming ==
The holotype, QMF 24537, was found at the Encore site at the Riversleigh World Heritage Area, in the Boodjamulla National Park of northwestern Queensland. It consists of a fractured and worn upper first or second molar. In 1998, Stephen Wroe described this specimen as representing a new genus and species, which he named Ganbulanyi djadjinguli. An upper second or third premolar was also referred to the taxon, but later became the type specimen for a new species of Malleodectes, M. moenia, in 2011.

The generic name is derived from the Waanyi word for “native cat”. The species name, pronounced “jad-jin-gulli”, is a combination of the Waanyi words for “to eat” (Djadji) and “bone” (nguli).

== Description ==
Ganbulanyi is distinguished from other dasyuromorphs primarily by various details of its molar. The upper molar is massive but low crowned. The occlusal (biting) surface of the protocone is small but robust, while the lingual face (side nearest the tongue) is steeply inclined. Viewed from the top of the tooth, the centrocrista is straight. The postmetacrista is aligned from front-to-back on the tooth. It retains stylar cusp C, but lacks stylar cusp E. All of the primary cusps are positioned close together. The stylar shelf is significantly small in size.

In 1998, Stephen Wroe stated that Ganbulanyi was no larger than 7 kg (15.4 lbs). In 2026, Australian palaeontologist Timothy Churchill and colleagues estimated its weight at 1 kg (2.2 lbs).

== Classification ==
Wroe (1998) tentatively referred Ganbulanyi to the family Dasyuridae. In addition, a close relationship with Sarcophilus harrisii was hypothesised on the basis of two to four synapomorphies. However, some doubt was cast by the author as G. djadjinguli retains plesiomorphic traits such as an upper third premolar and stylar cusp C on its upper molar. A study published in 2016 by Archer and colleagues noted similarities with the Malleodectidae but refrained from referring it to this clade due to substantial differences.

== Paleobiology ==
=== Diet ===
The dentition of Ganbulanyi exhbits adaptations towards hypercarnivory. Additionally, tooth wear suggests that it was also well suited for ‘bone-cracking’, a type of durophagy in which the animal is able to obtain to extract food contained in bony material.

=== Paleoenvironment ===
Ganbulanyi is known from Encore Site at the Riversleigh World Heritage Area, which is interpreted as being part of Riversleigh's Faunal Zone D. It is estimated to be Late Miocene in age, or approximately 12 to 10 million years old, through biocorrelation. The site represents a cave deposit, the original entrance of which appears to have acted as a natural pit-fall trap. Various factors like the high number of arboreal taxa and the abundance of very large taxa suggests that the environment surrounding the cave was open forest.

A vast diversity of fauna is known from Encore Site, comprising mammals and other vertebrates. Possums are especially abundant at this locality and are represented by the burramyid Burramys, the phalangerid Trichosurus, and two unnamed pseudocheirids. Other mammals include the dasyuromorphs Mayigriphus and Malleodectes, the bandicoot Madju, the koala Phascolarctos, the wombat Warendja, the marsupial lion Wakaleo, the diprotodontoids Neohelos and Palorchestes, and the macropods Ekaltadeta and Ganguroo. Other vertebrates include snakes, lizards, birds, and lungfish.
