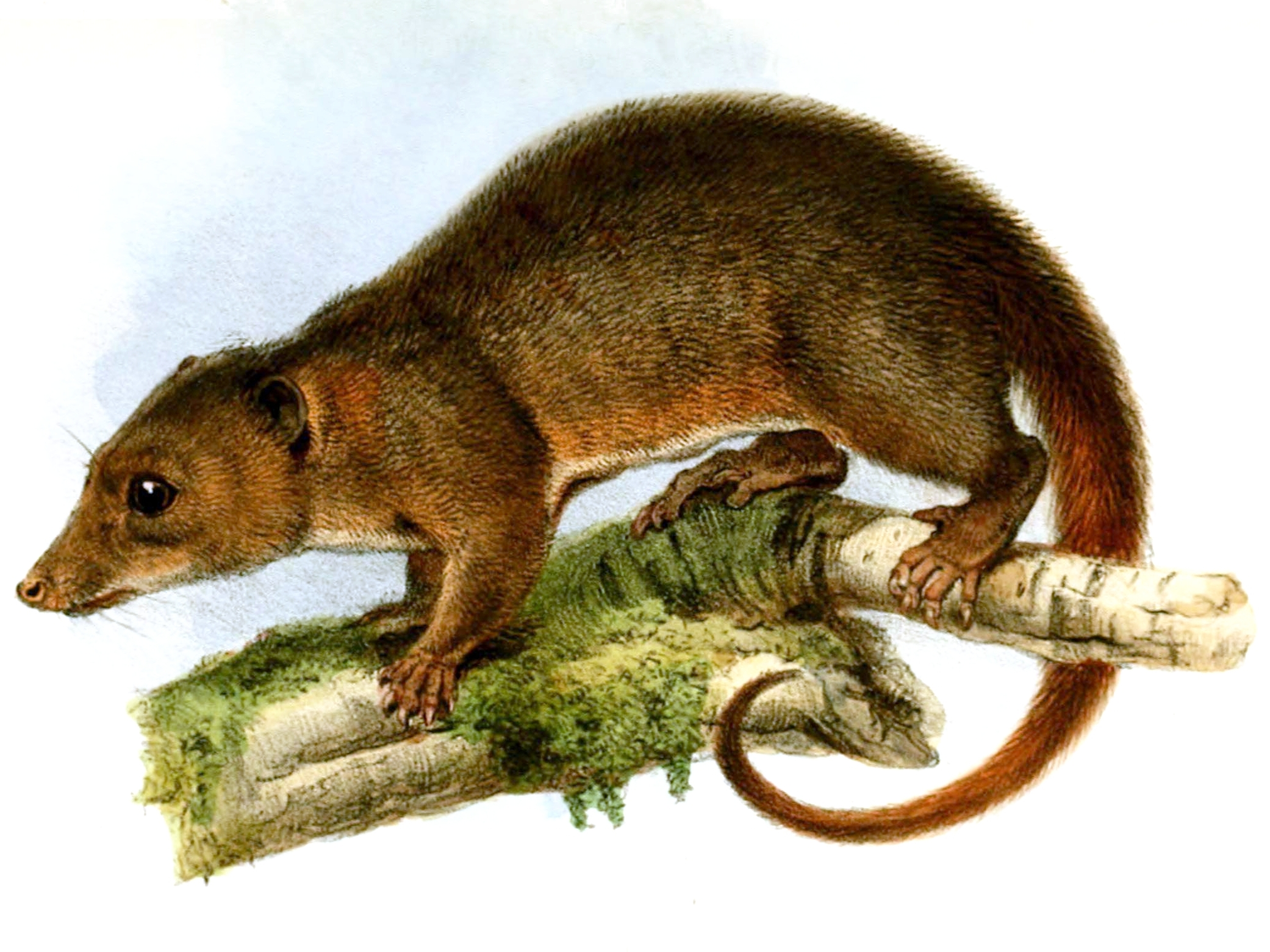
- Myoictis wallacii

Scientific classification
- Kingdom: Animalia
- Phylum: Chordata
- Class: Mammalia
- Infraclass: Marsupialia
- Order: Dasyuromorphia
- Family: Dasyuridae
- Subfamily: Dasyurinae
- Tribe: Dasyurini
- Genus: Myoictis; J. E. Gray, 1858

Type species
- Myoictis wallacii J. E. Gray, 1858

Species
- M. leucura; M. melas; M. wallacii; M. wavicus

= Myoictis =

Genus of marsupials

Myoictis or striped dasyure is a genus of marsupials in the order Dasyuromorphia. It is found in New Guinea.

There are four species:

- Woolley's three-striped dasyure, Myoictis leucura
- Three-striped dasyure, Myoictis melas
- Wallace's dasyure, Myoictis wallacii
- Tate's three-striped dasyure, Myoictis wavicus

The taxonomy for the species was difficult for most biologists to understand. Woolley proposed the names of the four different species by recognizing the animal by the morphological differences. While also using genetic testing, scientists have found that Myoictis melas and Myoictis wallacei contain a sequence divergence of 12.85%.

Each of the four species were found to have significant physical differences between them. Myoictis wavicus averages roughly 122 grams, Myoictis wallacei averages roughly 230 grams, Myoictis leucura averages roughly 220 grams, and Myoictis melas averages roughly 220 grams. The proportions of head and limb size were also found to be smaller with the smaller mass.

Myoictis leucura, or Woolley's three-striped dasyure was recently described being genetically and morphologically distinct from the other members of the genus Myoictis. It is more similar to the M. wavicus.

Between 1894 and 1895, Myoictis leucura was found in Papua New Guinea, the southern side of the Central Cordillera. It normally lives in elevations between 650 meters and 1600 meters. The species inhabits mostly lowland and montane forest. Peter Dwyer has found the species to be active during the daytime and being mostly terrestrial.
