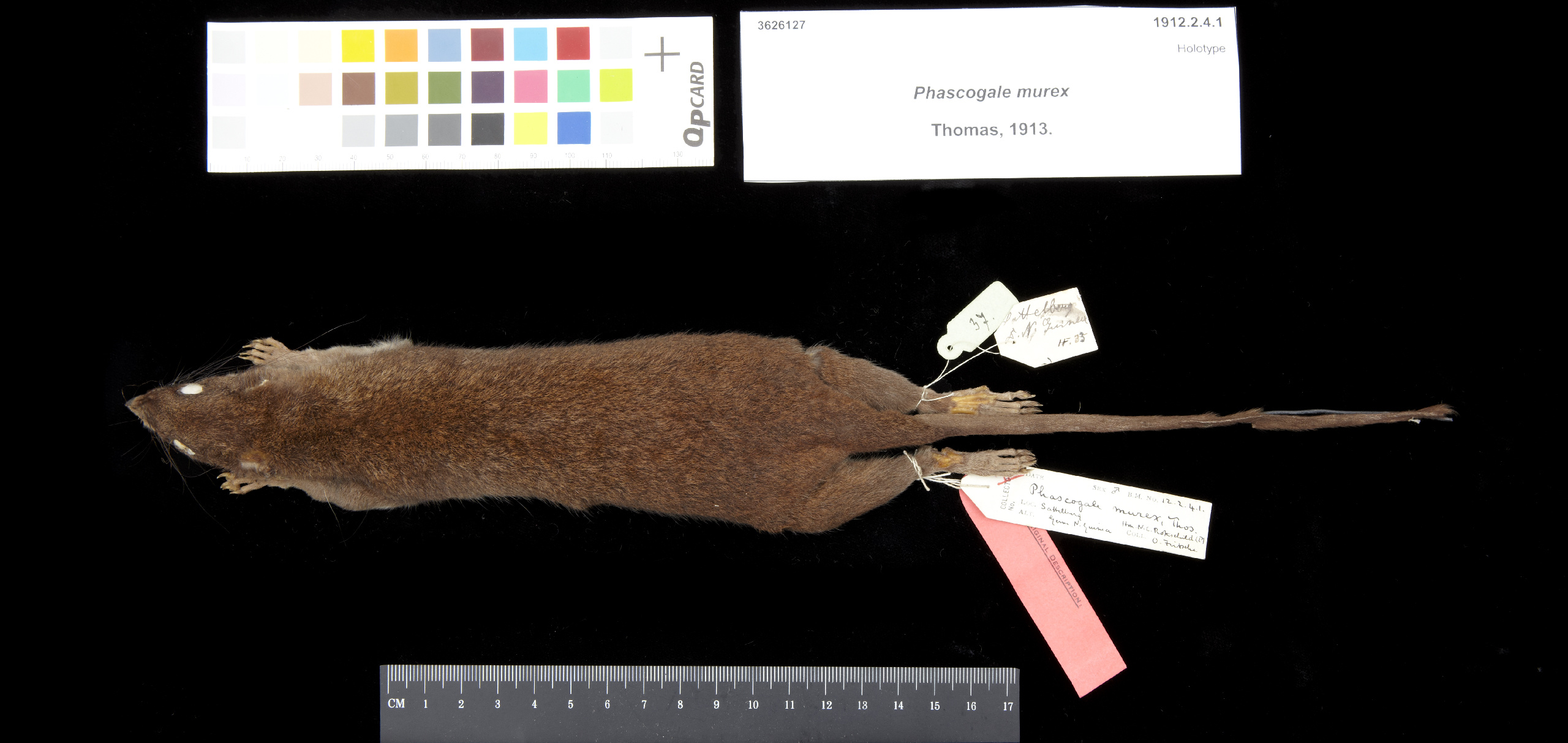
- Murexia longicaudata

Scientific classification
- Kingdom: Animalia
- Phylum: Chordata
- Class: Mammalia
- Infraclass: Marsupialia
- Order: Dasyuromorphia
- Family: Dasyuridae
- Subfamily: Dasyurinae
- Tribe: Phascogalini
- Genus: Murexia; Tate & Archbold, 1937

Type species
- Phascogale murex Thomas, 1913 (= Phascogale longicaudata Schlegel, 1866)

Species
- See text

= Murexia =

Genus of marsupials

Murexia is a genus of mouse-sized dasyure, in the marsupial order Dasyuromorphia. They are found in Papua, Indonesia and Papua New Guinea.

== Species ==
The genus was previously considered a monotypic genus, but now multiple species are recognised.

- Habbema dasyure (Murexia habbema)
- short-furred dasyure (Murexia longicaudata)
- black-tailed dasyure (Murexia melanurus)
- long-nosed dasyure (Murexia naso)
- broad-striped dasyure (Murexia rothschildi)
