= Woolley's three-striped dasyure =

Conservation status
- Data Deficient (IUCN 3.1)

Scientific classification
- Kingdom: Animalia
- Phylum: Chordata
- Class: Mammalia
- Infraclass: Marsupialia
- Order: Dasyuromorphia
- Family: Dasyuridae
- Genus: Myoictis
- Species: M. leucura

Binomial name
- Myoictis leucura Woolley, 2005

Species of marsupial

Woolley's three-striped dasyure (Myoictis leucura) is a member of the order Dasyuromorphia. This marsupial carnivore lives in Papua New Guinea.

This species inhabits primary montane forest. Like its congeners, it appears to be diurnal and largely terrestrial. Peter Dwyer has noted seeing this species active during daylight hours.
