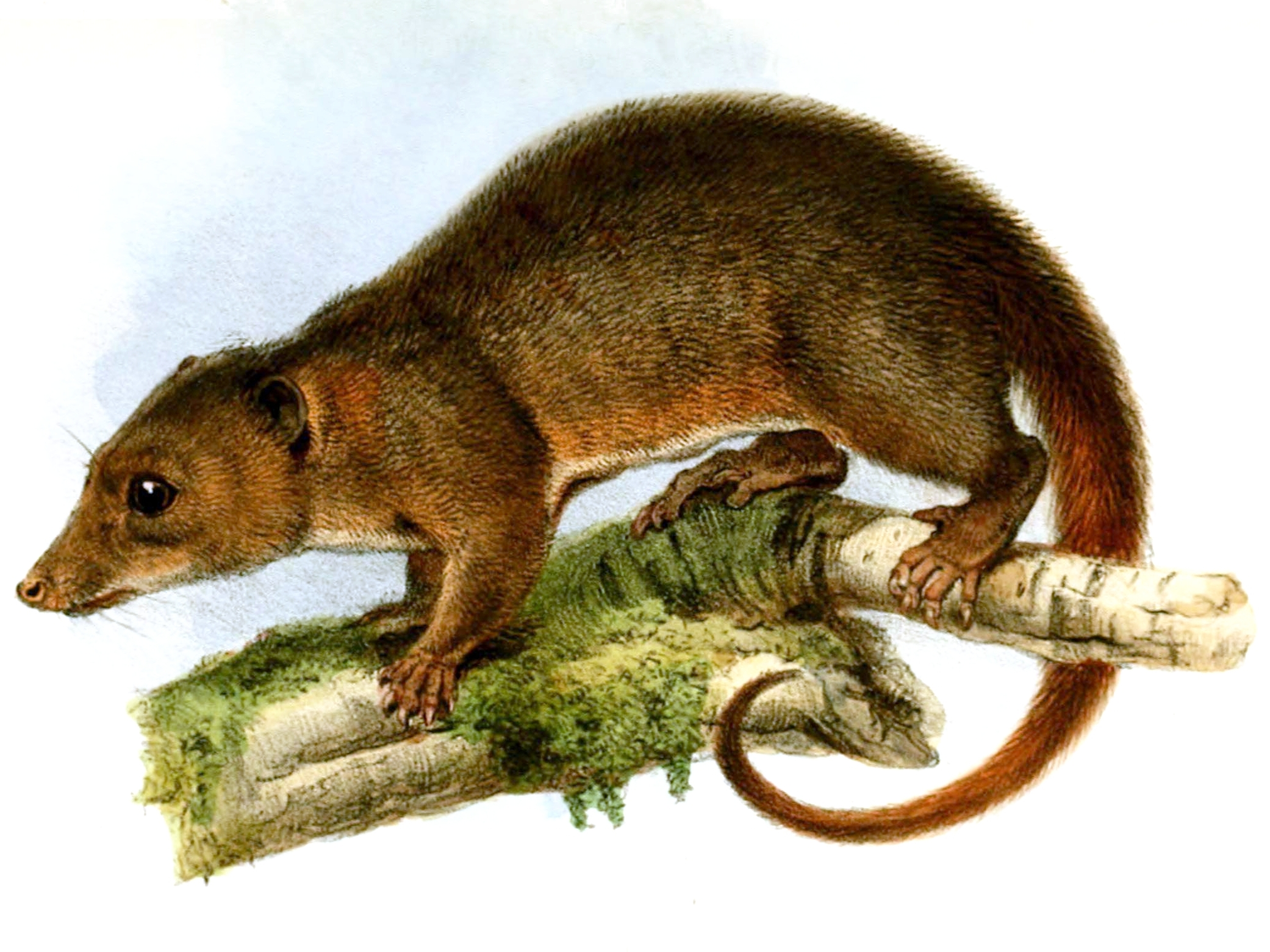

Conservation status
- Least Concern (IUCN 3.1)

Scientific classification
- Kingdom: Animalia
- Phylum: Chordata
- Class: Mammalia
- Infraclass: Marsupialia
- Order: Dasyuromorphia
- Family: Dasyuridae
- Genus: Myoictis
- Species: M. wallacei

Binomial name
- Myoictis wallacei J. E. Gray, 1858
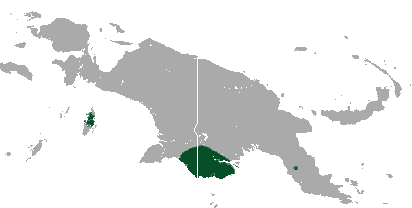
- Wallace's dasyure range

= Wallace's dasyure =

Species of marsupial

Wallace's dasyure (Myoictis wallacei) or Wallace's three-striped dasyure is a member of the order Dasyuromorphia. This marsupial carnivore is found in Indonesia and Papua New Guinea. Specifically, it is found on the Aru Islands of the Maluku Province of Indonesia.

The scientific name of this animal comes from British naturalist, Alfred Russel Wallace, who collected a specimen in the Aru Islands.
