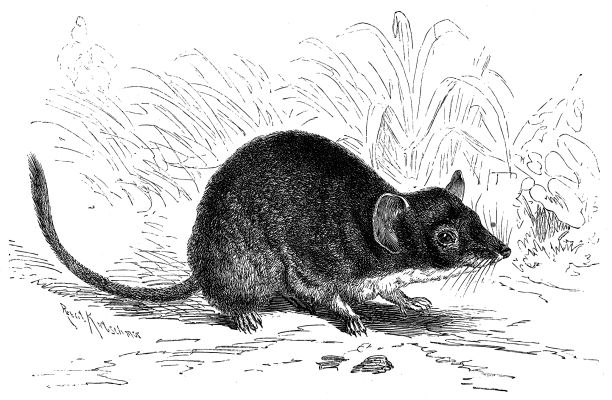
- Yellow-footed antechinus (Antechinus flaviceps)

Scientific classification
- Kingdom: Animalia
- Phylum: Chordata
- Class: Mammalia
- Infraclass: Marsupialia
- Order: Dasyuromorphia
- Family: Dasyuridae
- Subfamily: Dasyurinae
- Tribe: Phascogalini; Gill, 1872

Genera
- Antechinus; Murexia; Phascogale

= Phascogalini =

Tribe of marsupials

The Phascogalini are a tribe in the family Dasyuridae, comprising seven genera of small marsupials native to Australia and New Guinea.

== Classification ==
- Tribe Phascogalini
  - Genus Antechinus
    - Tropical antechinus, Antechinus adustus
    - Agile antechinus, Antechinus agilis
    - Fawn antechinus, Antechinus bellus
    - Yellow-footed antechinus, Antechinus flaviceps
    - Atherton antechinus, Antechinus godmani
    - Cinnamon antechinus, Antechinus leo
    - Swamp antechinus, Antechinus minimus
    - Brown antechinus, Antechinus stuartii
    - Subtropical antechinus, Antechinus subtropicus
    - Dusky antechinus, Antechinus swainsonii
  - Genus Murexia
    - Short-furred dasyure, Murexia longicaudata
    - Long-nosed dasyure, Murexia naso
    - Black-tailed dasyure, Murexia melanurus
    - Habbema dasyure, Murexia habbema
    - Broad-striped dasyure, Murexia rothschildi
  - Genus Phascogale
    - Red-tailed phascogale, Phascogale calura
    - Brush-tailed phascogale, Phascogale tapoatafa
    - Northern brush-tailed phascogale Phascogale pirata
