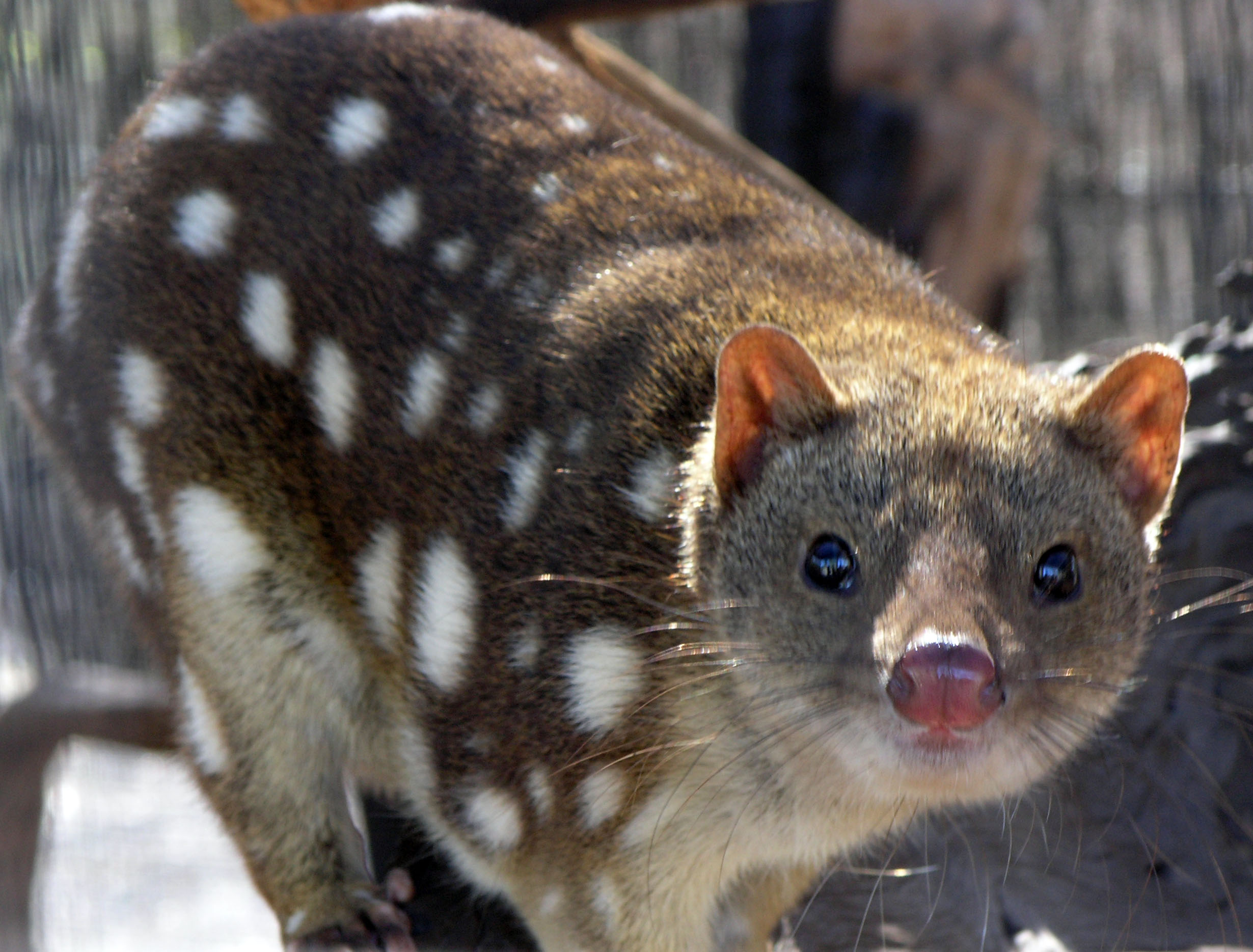
- Tiger quoll

Scientific classification
- Domain: Eukaryota
- Kingdom: Animalia
- Phylum: Chordata
- Class: Mammalia
- Infraclass: Marsupialia
- Order: Dasyuromorphia
- Family: Dasyuridae
- Subfamily: Dasyurinae; Goldfuss, 1820

Tribes
- Dasyurini - 10 genera Phascogalini - 7 genera

= Dasyurinae =

Subfamily of mammals

The subfamily Dasyurinae includes several genera of small carnivorous marsupials native to Australia: quolls, kowari, mulgara, kaluta, dibblers, phascogales, pseudantechinuses, and the Tasmanian devil. The subfamily is defined largely on biochemical criteria.

Order Dasyuromorphia

- Family Thylacinidae
- Family Dasyuridae: (carnivorous marsupials)
  - Subfamily Dasyurinae:
    - Tribe Dasyurini
      - Mulgaras = Dasycercus spp.
      - Little red kaluta = Dasykaluta rosamondae
      - Kowari = Dasyuroides byrnei
        - †Dasyuroides achilpatna Archer, 1982
      - Quolls = Dasyurus spp.
      - Some dasyures = Myoictis and Neophascogale spp.
      - Dibbler = Parantechinus apicalis
      - Marsupial shrews = Phascolosorex spp.
      - False antechinuses = Pseudantechinus spp. (includes sandstone dibbler)
      - Tasmanian devil = Sarcophilus harrisii
    - Tribe Phascogalini
      - Antechinuses = Antechinus spp.
      - Other dasyures = Micromurexia, Murexechinus, Murexia, Paramurexia, Phascomurexia spp.
      - Phascogales = Phascogale spp.
  - Subfamily Sminthopsinae: dunnarts, kultarr, planigales, and ningauis
- Family Myrmecobiidae
