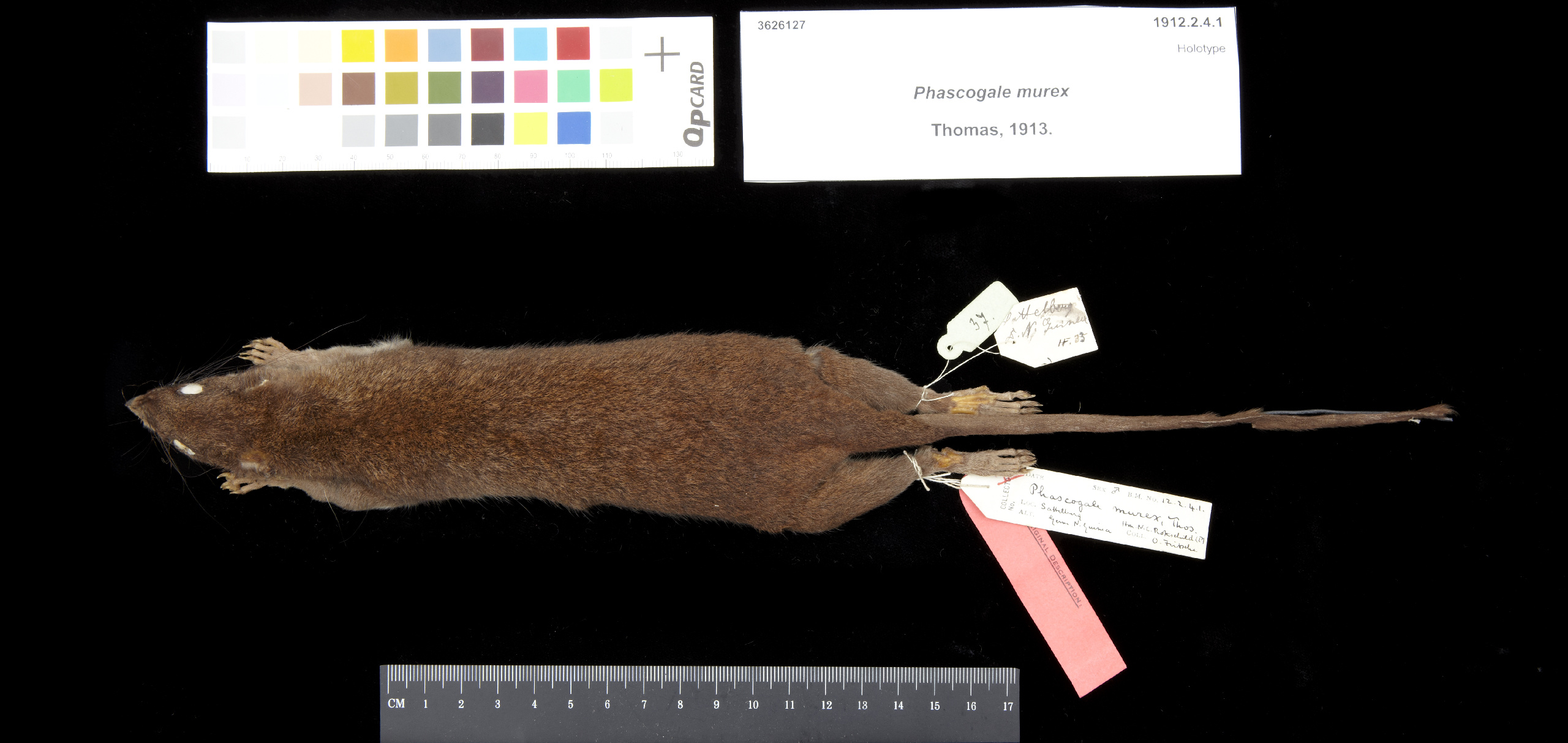
- Preserved specimen

Conservation status
- Least Concern (IUCN 3.1)

Scientific classification
- Kingdom: Animalia
- Phylum: Chordata
- Class: Mammalia
- Infraclass: Marsupialia
- Order: Dasyuromorphia
- Family: Dasyuridae
- Subfamily: Dasyurinae
- Tribe: Phascogalini
- Genus: Murexia
- Species: M. longicaudata

Binomial name
- Murexia longicaudata (Schlegel, 1866)
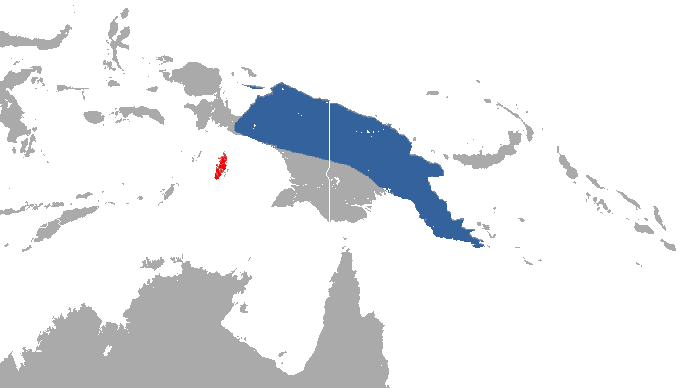
- Short-furred dasyure range (blue — native, red — introduced)

= Short-furred dasyure =

Species of marsupial

The short-furred dasyure (Murexia longicaudata), also known as the short-haired marsupial mouse, is a member of the order Dasyuromorphia. It was once recognised as the only species in the genus Murexia, but now five species are recognised. It lives in Papua, Indonesia and Papua New Guinea.

== Conservation status ==
Its population is considered stable, so the species is listed as "Least Concern" by the IUCN.

== Systematics ==
The short-furred dasyure used to form the genus Murexia together with the broad-striped dasyure. In 2005, Colin Groves divided the genus Murexia into two monotypic genera, Murexia for the short-furred dasyure and Paramurexia for the broad-striped dasyure, based on cladistic analyses.
