= Stephen Wroe =

Australian palaeontologist, YouTuber

- Education: University of New South Wales
- Known for: Carnivores, marsupials
- Scientific career
- Fields: Biomechanics, Palaeontology, Physical anthropology, Zoology
- Workplaces: University of New England (Australia)

Stephen Wroe (also known as Steve Wroe) is an Australian vertebrate palaeontologist, biomechanist, YouTuber, and science communicator.

As a researcher, he is best known for his work describing and evaluating carnivores, especially measuring their bite force quotient.

Currently, he is Professor in Evolutionary Biology at the University of New England (Australia)'s School of Environmental and Rural Science.

== Education ==
He obtained a science degree with honors at the University of New South Wales in 1991 and obtained a Ph.D. in paleontology at the same university in 1999.

== Career ==
Wroe worked briefly as a research fellow at the Australian Museum before taking up a postdoctoral fellowship at the University of Sydney. In 2005 he was awarded a Queen Elizabeth II Fellowship and an Australian Research Council Discovery Outstanding Researcher Award in 2013.

Below is a list of taxa that Wroe has contributed to naming:

Year	Taxon	Authors
2001	Joculusium muizoni gen. et sp. nov.	Wroe
2001	Maximucinus muirheadae gen. et sp. nov.	Wroe
1999	Djarthia murgonensis gen. et sp. nov.	Godthelp, Wroe, & Archer
1999	Barinya wangala gen. et sp. nov.	Wroe
1998	Badjcinus turnbulli gen. et sp. nov.	Muirhead & Wroe
1998	Ganbulanyi djadjinguli gen. et sp. nov.	Wroe
1996	Ekaltadeta jamiemulvaneyi sp. nov.	Wroe
1996	Muribacinus gadiyuli gen. et sp. nov.	Wroe

== Publications ==
=== Popular Science ===
- Attard, M.; Wroe, S. (June 2012). "The thylacine myth". Australasian Science. 33 (5): 19–22. ISSN 1442-679X.
- Wroe, S. (2005). "On little lizards and the big extinction blame game" (PDF). Guest Editorial. Quaternary Australasia. 23 (1): 8–12. ISSN 0811-0433.
- Wroe, Stephen (May 1999). "Killer Kangaroos and Other Murderous Marsupials". Scientific American. 280 (5): 68–74. Bibcode:1999SciAm.280e..68W. doi:10.1038/scientificamerican0599-68. ISSN 0036-8733. JSTOR 26058244. PMID 10231989.
- Wroe, Stephen (2004). "Factors behind the rarity of large mammalian carnivores". Australasian Science: 21–23. ISSN 1442-679X.
- Wroe, Stephen; Field, Judith; Fullagar, Richard (Winter 2002). "Lost Giants" (PDF). Nature Australia. 27 (5). Australian Museum: 54–61. ISSN 1324-2598.

== Media ==
Wroe was quoted by BBC News on the issue of whether Neanderthals could speak.

=== TV Shows ===
He has appeared in:

Year	Title	Season	Episode No.	Series Title	Network
2001	Marsupial Carnivores	1	9	Killer Instinct with Rob Bredl	Amazon Prime
2002	What Killed the Mega Beasts?	-	-	-	Discovery Channel
2009	Death of the Mega Beasts	-	-	-	Discovery Channel
2009	Monster Shark	1	5	Prehistoric Predators	National Geographic Channel

=== YouTube Channel ===
Wroe's YouTube channel is called "Real Paleontology".

== Honours ==
Wroe has had the species Protamalleus stevewroei named after him.
