= Mutpuracinus =

Mutpuracinus Temporal range: Middle Miocene

Scientific classification
- Kingdom: Animalia
- Phylum: Chordata
- Class: Mammalia
- Infraclass: Marsupialia
- Order: Dasyuromorphia
- Family: †Thylacinidae
- Genus: †Mutpuracinus
- Species: †M. archibaldi

Binomial name
- †Mutpuracinus archibaldi Murray & Megirian, 2000

Extinct species of marsupial

Mutpuracinus archibaldi is an extinct carnivorous, quadrupedal marsupial that lived during the middle Miocene and is the smallest known thylacinid at approximately 1.1 kilograms, the size of a quoll, though, more closely related to the recently extinct thylacine.

M. archibaldi would have resembled a dog with a long snout. Its molar teeth were specialized for carnivory, the cups and crest were reduced or elongated to give the molars a cutting blade.

Fossils of M. archibaldi have been discovered in deposits at Bullock Creek (Northern Territory) in the Northern Territory of Australia, and in the same deposits as Nimbacinus richi. It is named in honor of Ian Archibald for his contributions to the northern territory. Fossil specimens of M. archibaldi include a premaxilla with alveoli for four incisors, and the holotype, a left maxilla. thylacinid skull fossils are exceedingly rare and M. archiboldi is one of only three species known from fossil crania.

== Taxonomy ==
The description of a new species and genus was published in 2000, the results of examination of fossil material discovered at the "Blast Site", associated with the Bullock Creek fossil beds in the Northern Territory. The describing authors, Peter F. Murray and Dirk Megirian, assigned the name Mutpuracinus to the new thylacinid genus, combining the Ancient Greek kynos, alluding to the canid family of dogs and wolves, and the word mutpura in reference to an Indigenous Australian people associated with the district at Camfield.
