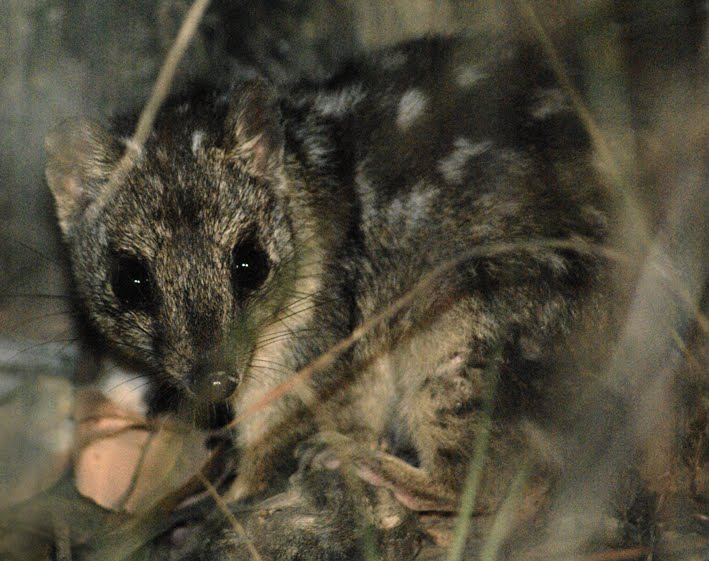
- In Queensland, Australia

Conservation status
- Endangered (IUCN 3.1)

- Endangered (EPBC Act)

Scientific classification
- Kingdom: Animalia
- Phylum: Chordata
- Class: Mammalia
- Infraclass: Marsupialia
- Order: Dasyuromorphia
- Family: Dasyuridae
- Genus: Dasyurus
- Species: D. hallucatus

Binomial name
- Dasyurus hallucatus Gould, 1842
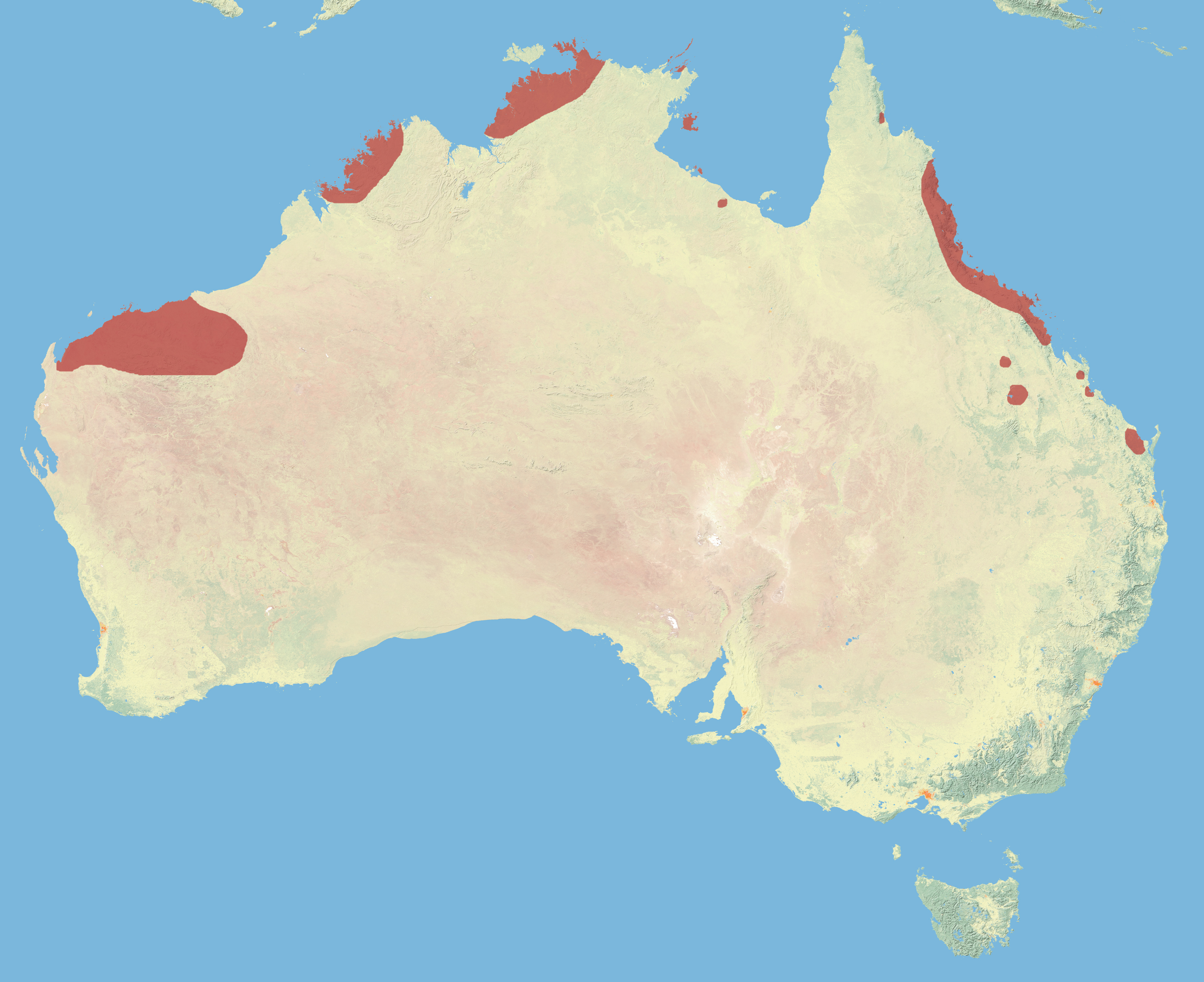
- Northern quoll range

= Northern quoll =

Species of marsupial native to Australia

The northern quoll (Dasyurus hallucatus), also known as the northern native cat, the North Australian native cat or the satanellus is a carnivorous marsupial native to Australia.

== Taxonomy ==
The northern quoll is a member of the family Dasyuridae. There are three other quoll species found in Australia, and another two species found on the island of New Guinea, all of which are currently placed in the genus Dasyurus. The northern quoll was first described in 1842 by naturalist and author John Gould, who gave it the specific epithet hallucatus, indicating that it has a notable first digit. This species has sometimes been placed in a separate genus, Satanellus.

Four distinct morphological forms of the northern quoll were recognised in the 1920s, however more recent population genomic analysis has shown that these forms do not conform to the underlying genetic differentiation shown across the species distribution. Three broad population genomic clusters are present in the species, which broadly correspond to populations in the regions of Queensland, Northern Territory and Western Australia. This population genomic structure conforms to known biogeographic barriers across northern Australia, including the Carpentarian Gap and Ord Arid Region. Finer scale population structure shows differentiation of the Groote Eylandt and Pilbara populations of quolls.

== Life history ==
The northern quoll is the smallest of the four Australian quoll species. Females are smaller than males, with adult females weighing between 240 and 690 g (8.5 and 24.3 oz) and adult males 340 and 1,120 g (12 and 40 oz). Head and body length ranges from 27–37 cm (11–15 in) for adult males and 25–31 cm (9.8–12.2 in) for adult females. The tail length ranges between 20 and 35 cm (7.9 and 13.8 in).

Northern quolls feed primarily on invertebrates, but also consume fleshy fruit (particularly figs), and a wide range of vertebrates, including small mammals, birds, lizards, snakes, and frogs. They also scavenge on roadkills, around campsites, and in garbage tins.

A remarkable feature of this species is that the males show complete die-off after mating, leaving the females to raise the young alone. Females have five to eight teats in a pouch, but apparently give birth to more than eight young which must wriggle their way to the pouch and compete for a teat to survive. In a study in Western Australia's Kimberley region, the testosterone levels of males peaked in July, and females gave birth in July or August.

In a study in Kakadu National Park, the Northern Territory, males live for about one year, while the maximum recorded for a wild female was about three years of age. Captive northern quolls are able to attain longer lifespans (M. Oakwood pers. obs.).

A 2001 study of male die-off found that during the mating season, males exhibited weight loss, fur loss, parasite infestation, increased testosterone levels and anaemia. During mating season, males adopted a roving strategy to try to access the maximum number of females. The females were widely spaced in savanna habitat so the males expended intense physical effort at that time, which was likely to be a major contributor to their physiological decline. In 2023, a study found that "reduced resting behaviour among males could explain the post-breeding death as the deterioration in appearance reflects that reported for sleep-deprived rodents."

== Range and habitat ==
The northern quoll occurs from the Pilbara region of Western Australia across the Northern Territory to south east Queensland. Their historical range extended uninterrupted from S.E Queensland to the Kimberley in Western Australia. There are several disjunct populations. This quoll species is most abundant in rocky ranges and open eucalypt forest. Analysis of occurrence records for the species shows that rocky areas are important for the species.

Northern quolls have declined substantially since European colonisation of Australia, with one study in the Northern Territory finding a roughly 60% contraction in their extent of occurrence. Of the nine species analysed, this decline was only exceeded by that of the brush-tailed rabbit-rat, the sole remaining species in the genus Conilurus. In the Northern Territory, northern quolls appear to be declining towards geographic areas of higher vegetation complexity, lower elevation, and milder temperatures, suggesting that, in these areas, threats may be mediated or better tolerated.

More geographically isolated populations, such as those on islands, have very small contributions to overall genetic diversity within the species, and also show relatively high levels of inbreeding compared to mainland populations.

== Conservation status ==
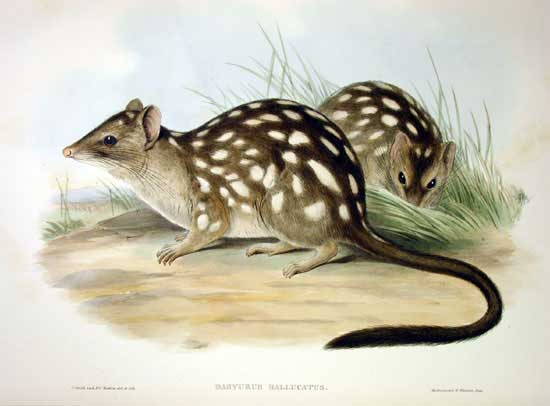
1863 illustration by Elizabeth Gould

The northern quoll is currently classified as Endangered by the IUCN.

The species is now absent from many parts of its former range, particularly the savanna country. In 2005 it was listed as Endangered under Australian Commonwealth legislation (EPBC Act). Threats are predation by feral cats, dingoes and red foxes, particularly after fire or grazing has removed protective ground cover. Destruction, degradation, and fragmentation of the quoll's habitat due to land clearing, grazing, pasture improvement, and mining are also significant. Quolls are also susceptible to being run over on roads.

The current major threat to the northern quoll in the northern and western portion of its range is the spread of cane toads. Like many other native Australian species, northern quolls are poisoned after eating or mouthing cane toads. Cane toads were originally introduced in Queensland, but have now occupied the Top End of the Northern Territory, including Kakadu National Park and the Darwin area, and entered the Kimberley region of Western Australia, where they are established around Kununurra and Lake Argyle.

Immediately after cane toad invasion of Kakadu, quolls became extinct at one study site and declined from 45 individuals to five at another site. The northern quoll may cease to exist in most areas in the Top End once the cane toad population completely overlaps the northern quoll's range. However, remnant populations of northern quolls still persist in Queensland where cane toads have been present for decades. These persisting Queensland quoll populations are naturally toad averse (as observed on remote cameras). One of the northern quoll populations studied in Kakadu during the recent cane toad invasion, had a few individuals survive the invasion. These individuals were, likely similar to the Queensland quolls, genetically averse to the toads. In 2003, to help protect northern quolls, numerous quolls were transferred to the toad-free English Company Islands (Astell and Pobassoo Islands), off the coast of Arnhem Land. Quolls thrived on these islands, with an estimated population of 2193 female northern quolls on Astell Island by 2014. In 2017, quolls from Astell Island were collected, trained via conditioned taste aversion to avoid attacking cane toads and reintroduced to Kakadu National Park. This reintroduction attempt saw the release both toad-trained (22) and toad-naive (9) northern quolls to an area of Kakadu that previous had quolls but where they had recently gone locally extinct due to the invasion of cane toads. Although the toad-trained quolls survived longer than those that received no toad training, ultimately this reintroduction population rapidly went extinct because of dingo predation. Subsequently, research comparing antipredator behaviours of quolls from Astell Island and mainland Queensland determined that quolls conserved on this island had lost their ability to recognise and avoid both dingo and cats, predators they have co-evolved with on mainland Australia for at least 3500 and 150 years respectively. This study suggests that animals conserved in complete isolation from predators can rapidly lose evolved antipredator behaviours, in this case in only 13 generations, when they are no longer maintained via natural selection.

Research has shown that the conservation of a single population, or even several populations, will not prevent the loss of substantial amounts of genomic variation and adaptive capacity across the species. To conserve more than 90% of the genetic diversity of the species, at least eight separate populations of northern quolls need to be conserved, which requires conservation of populations in Queensland, the Northern Territory, and Western Australia.

In 2022, Territory Natural Resource Management (TRM) partnered with Australian Wildlife Conservancy, James Cook University, Gulf Savannah NRM, and Western Yalanji to trial conservation methods, including artificial dens for quolls, genetic research and controlled burn programs. The project received grant funding from the Australian Government's Environment Restoration Fund.

== In Aboriginal language and culture ==
The Northern Quoll is known as njanjma in the Indigenous Kundjeyhmi, Kundedjnjenghmi and Mayali languages, djabbo in Kunwinjku, and wijingarri in Wunambal. The Kunwinjku people of Western Arnhem Land (Northern Territory) regard djabbo as "good tucker".
