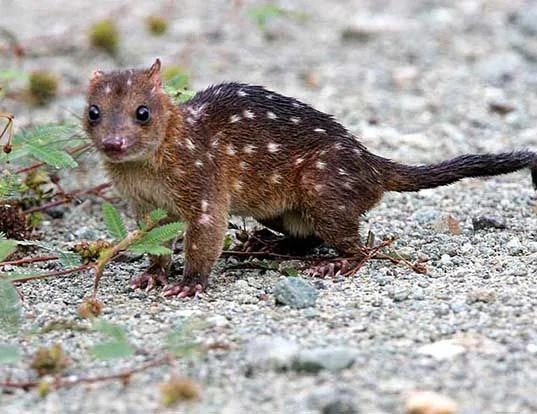

Conservation status
- Near Threatened (IUCN 3.1)

Scientific classification
- Kingdom: Animalia
- Phylum: Chordata
- Class: Mammalia
- Infraclass: Marsupialia
- Order: Dasyuromorphia
- Family: Dasyuridae
- Genus: Dasyurus
- Species: D. albopunctatus

Binomial name
- Dasyurus albopunctatus Schlegel, 1880
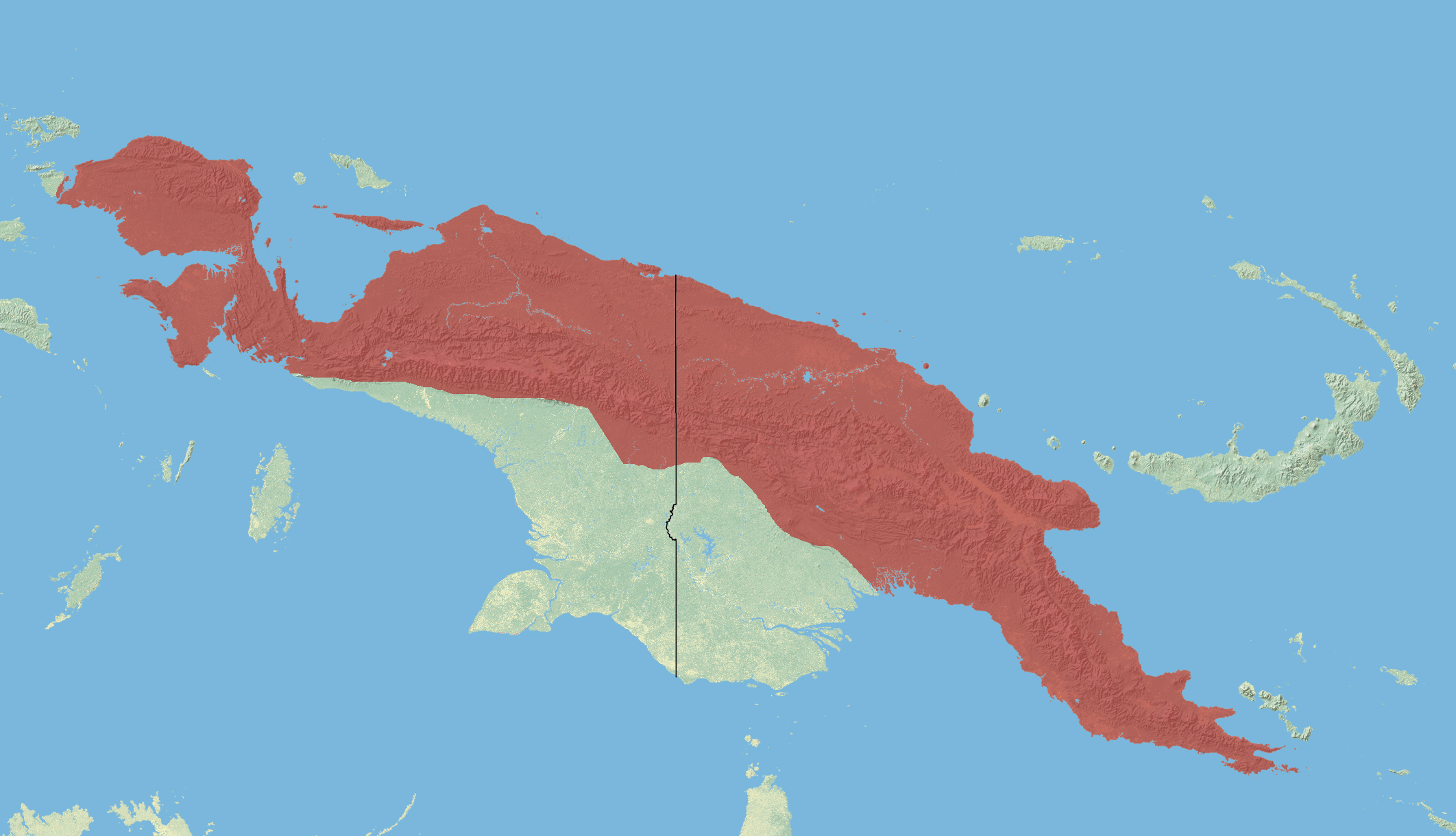
- New Guinean quoll range

= New Guinean quoll =

Species of marsupial

The New Guinean quoll (Dasyurus albopunctatus), also known as the New Guinea quoll or New Guinea native cat, is a carnivorous marsupial mammal native to New Guinea. It is the second-largest surviving marsupial carnivore of New Guinea. (Note: Only the bronze quoll (Dasyurus spartacus) is larger.) It is known as suatg in the Kalam language of Papua New Guinea.

== Taxonomy ==
The New Guinean quoll belongs to Dasyuridae, a family of carnivorous marsupials, which includes other species of quolls, the Tasmanian devil, and many smaller carnivores. It is one of six extant species of quolls, four of which are found in only in Australia and two of which are restricted to New Guinea (the bronze quoll is the other New Guinean species). Both the quolls found in New Guinea seem to be most closely related to the Australian western quoll.

== Description ==
The New Guinean quoll is small, usually weighing just over 1 lb (0.45 kg). Its body is brown and the back spotted with white; the spots do not extend onto the lightly haired tail. It resembles a cat-like opossum; the quolls are also referred to as "native cats" and occasionally "marsupial cats" or "tiger cats". Its feet have transversely striated pads, which is likely to be an adaptation for grip and is indicative of a life spent in the trees. It lives throughout the forests of New Guinea at elevations up to 11,000 ft (3300 m) but usually closer to 3,000 ft (900 m). The population appears to be centered in the highlands of New Guinea.

== Behaviour and diet ==
Quolls feed on a large range of prey, including birds, rats, other marsupials, small reptiles, and insects. They are reported to feed on prey larger than themselves. They are good climbers, but also spend time on the forest floor. Although nocturnal, they spend the daylight hours basking in the sun. They nest in rocky banks, hollow logs, or small caves. In captivity, the longest recorded survival is three years, but their lifespan in the wild is unknown.

== Threats ==
The number of New Guinean quolls is believed to be decreasing as a result of human encroachment into their habitat and the associated loss of cover. Because they are known to scavenge, persecution by humans may be putting pressure on the population. They also face predation and competition from introduced species such as dogs and cats.

Another threat, though less severe than with the four Australian species of Dasyurus, is poisoning by bufotoxins from the introduced cane toad (Rhinella marina, formerly Bufo marinus). Because they have evolved consistently isolated from toads since the Jurassic, all dasyurids possess extremely low resistance to toad toxins, and whilst smaller dasyurids usually do develop conditioned taste aversion to toads, there is little evidence for this in quolls.
