= Urrayira =

Urrayira Temporal range: Chibanian

Scientific classification
- Kingdom: Animalia
- Phylum: Chordata
- Class: Mammalia
- Infraclass: Marsupialia
- Order: Dasyuromorphia
- Genus: †Urrayira
- Species: †U. whitei

Binomial name
- †Urrayira whitei Cramb et al., 2023

Extinct genus of dasyuromorphian

Urrayira is an extinct genus of dasyuromorphian marsupial that lived in Australia during the Chibanian stage of the Pleistocene epoch.

== Palaeobiology ==
=== Palaeoecology ===
Urrayira whitei was most likely a specialist taxon that inhabited rainforest environments, making it vulnerable to the aridification associated with the Mid-Brunhes climatic shift.
