= Black-tailed dasyure =

Conservation status
- Least Concern (IUCN 3.1)

Scientific classification
- Kingdom: Animalia
- Phylum: Chordata
- Class: Mammalia
- Infraclass: Marsupialia
- Order: Dasyuromorphia
- Family: Dasyuridae
- Subfamily: Dasyurinae
- Tribe: Phascogalini
- Genus: Murexia
- Species: M. melanurus

Binomial name
- Murexia melanurus (Thomas, 1899)
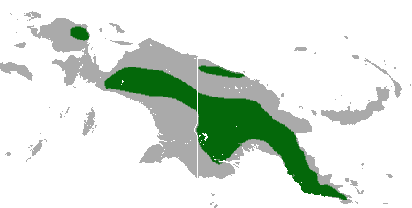
- black-tailed dasyure range

Synonyms
- Murexechinus melanurus (Van Dyck, 2002); Antechinus melanurus (Thomas, 1899); Antechinus wilhelmina (Tate, 1947); Murexia melanura (O. Thomas, 1899)

Species of marsupial

The black-tailed dasyure (Murexia melanurus) is a species of marsupial in the family Dasyuridae.

== Range and habitat ==
The Black-tailed dasyure is native to New Guinea, where it ranges across the Central Cordillera of Western New Guinea, which is part of Indonesia, and of Papua New Guinea. It is also present in the Arfak Mountains of Western New Guinea and the Torricelli Mountains in northern Papua New Guinea. It is found from sea level to mid-montane areas up to 2,800 meters elevation.

Its natural habitat is forest, including lowland rain forest and montane rain forest (mid-montane forest, beech forest, pandanus forest, and mossy forest).

It is fairly abundant across its range, and its population is stable.

== Breeding ==
The Black-tailed dasyure breeds throughout the year. Females have up to four young.
