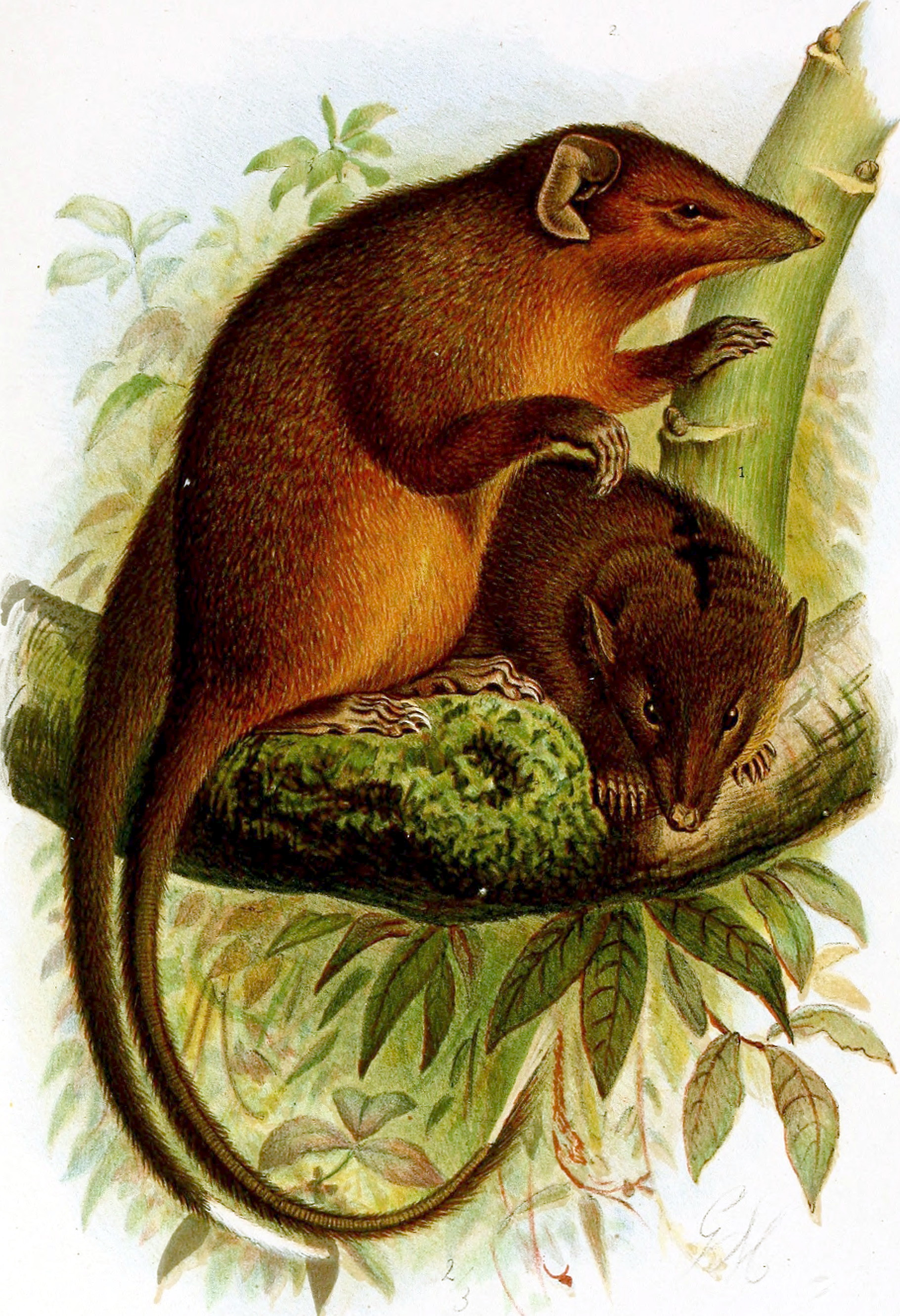

Conservation status
- Least Concern (IUCN 3.1)

Scientific classification
- Kingdom: Animalia
- Phylum: Chordata
- Class: Mammalia
- Infraclass: Marsupialia
- Order: Dasyuromorphia
- Family: Dasyuridae
- Genus: Phascolosorex
- Species: P. dorsalis

Binomial name
- Phascolosorex dorsalis (Peters & Doria, 1876)
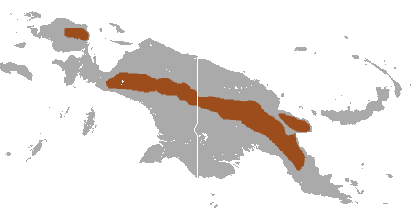
- Narrow-striped marsupial shrew range

= Narrow-striped marsupial shrew =

Species of marsupial

The narrow-striped dasyure or narrow-striped marsupial shrew (Phascolosorex dorsalis) is a species of marsupial in the family Dasyuridae found in West Papua and Papua New Guinea. Its natural habitat is subtropical or tropical dry forests.

== Names ==
It is known as aln in the Kalam language of Papua New Guinea.
