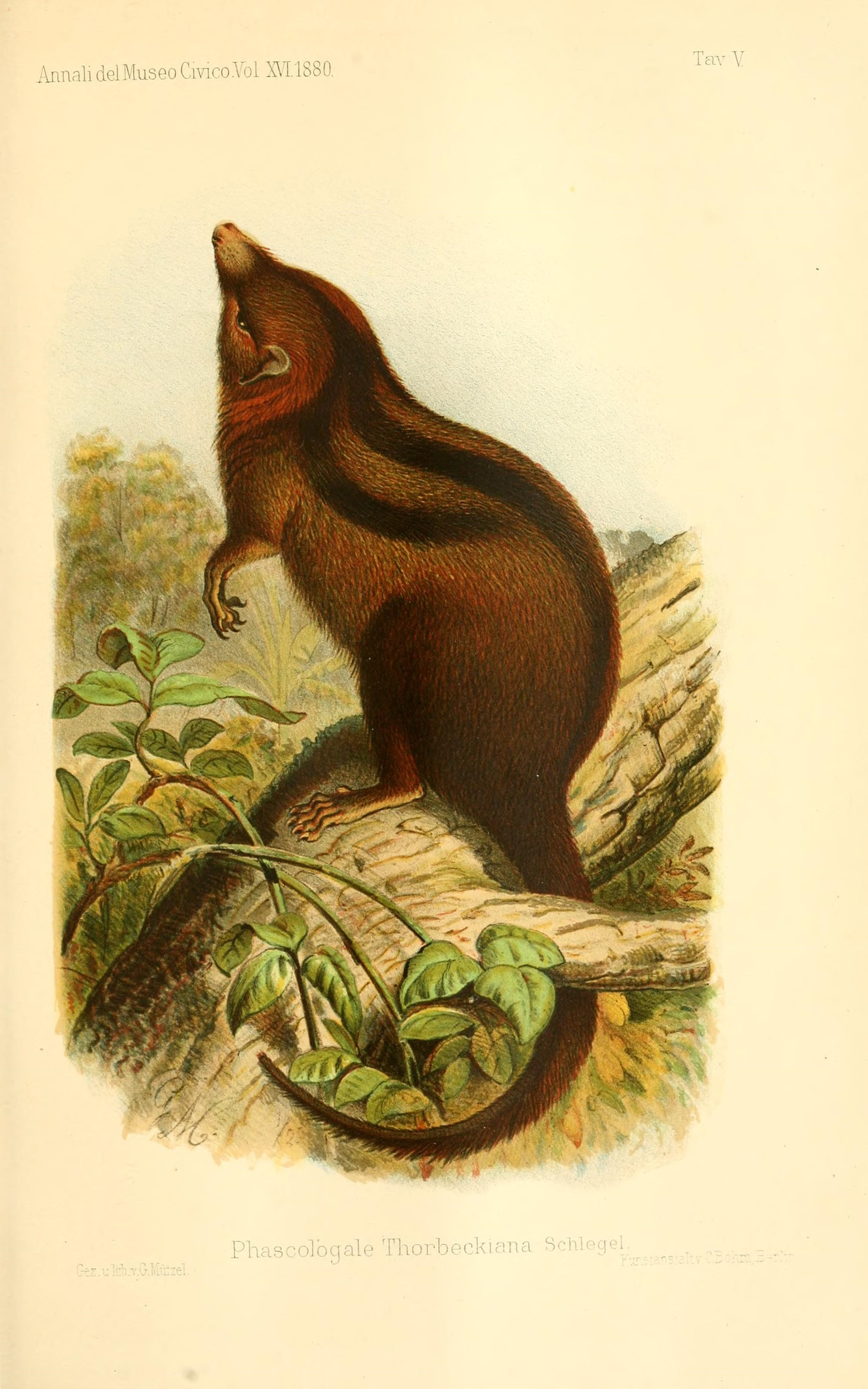

Conservation status
- Least Concern (IUCN 3.1)

Scientific classification
- Kingdom: Animalia
- Phylum: Chordata
- Class: Mammalia
- Infraclass: Marsupialia
- Order: Dasyuromorphia
- Family: Dasyuridae
- Genus: Myoictis
- Species: M. melas

Binomial name
- Myoictis melas (S. Müller, 1840)
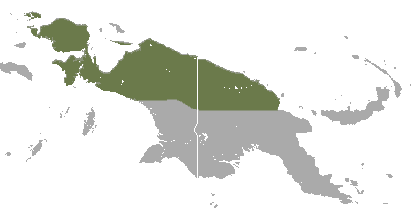
- Three-striped dasyure range

= Three-striped dasyure =

Species of marsupial

The three-striped dasyure (Myoictis melas) is a member of the order Dasyuromorphia. This marsupial carnivore lives in West Papua and Papua New Guinea.
