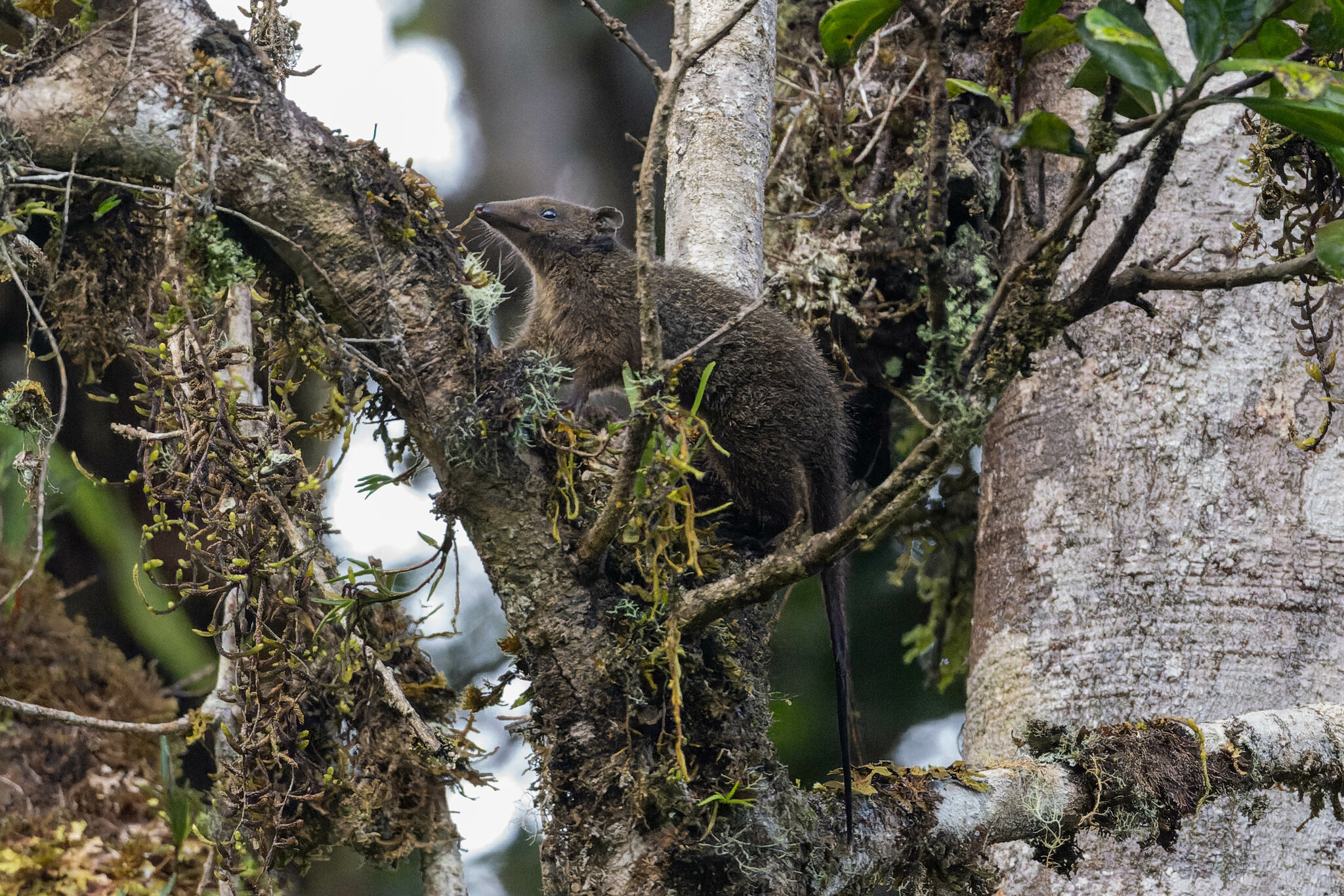

Conservation status
- Least Concern (IUCN 3.1)

Scientific classification
- Kingdom: Animalia
- Phylum: Chordata
- Class: Mammalia
- Infraclass: Marsupialia
- Order: Dasyuromorphia
- Family: Dasyuridae
- Subfamily: Dasyurinae
- Tribe: Dasyurini
- Genus: Neophascogale; Stein, 1933
- Species: N. lorentzii

Binomial name
- Neophascogale lorentzii (Jentink, 1911)
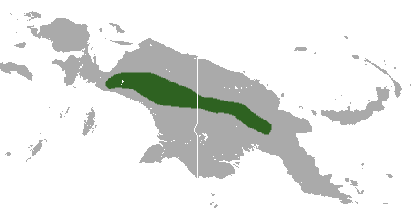
- Speckled dasyure range

= Speckled dasyure =

Species of marsupial

The speckled dasyure (Neophascogale lorentzii), also known as the long-clawed marsupial mouse, is a member of the order Dasyuromorphia. It is an inhabitant of Papua, Indonesia and Papua New Guinea. It is the only member of the genus Neophascogale.

Its weight varies between 200 and 250 g (7.1 and 8.8 oz); its body length ranges from 16–23 cm (6.3–9.1 in), and the tail is 16–23 cm (6.3–9.1 in) long. As its name suggested, its dark gray fur is speckled with long white hairs. It has short, powerful limbs with long claws on all toes, used to dig for grubs, worms, and similar prey.
