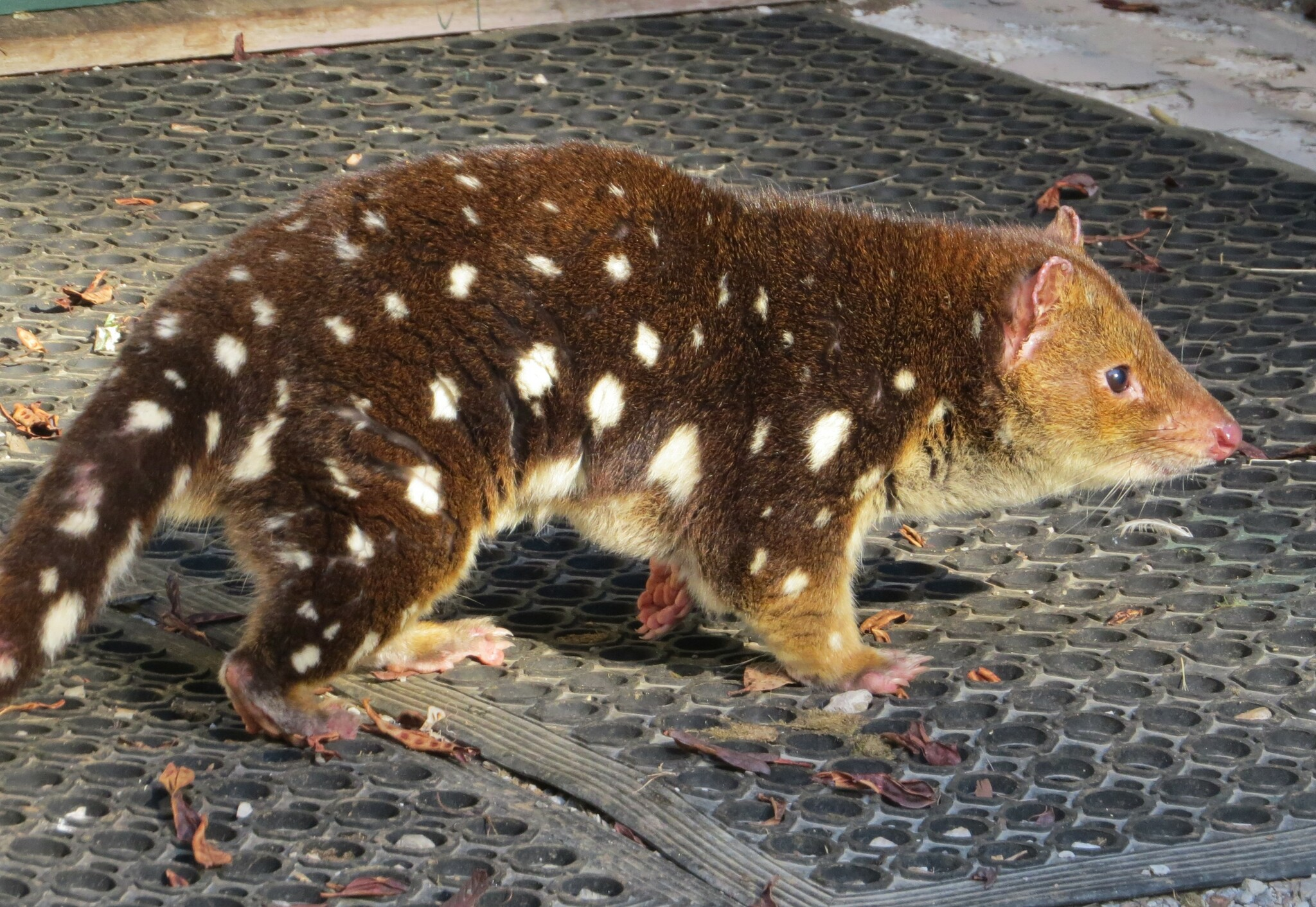
- In Tasmania

Conservation status
- Near Threatened (IUCN 3.1)

- Vulnerable (EPBC Act)

Scientific classification
- Kingdom: Animalia
- Phylum: Chordata
- Class: Mammalia
- Infraclass: Marsupialia
- Order: Dasyuromorphia
- Family: Dasyuridae
- Genus: Dasyurus
- Species: D. maculatus

Binomial name
- Dasyurus maculatus (Kerr, 1792)

Subspecies
- Dasyurus maculatus maculatus; Dasyurus maculatus gracilis
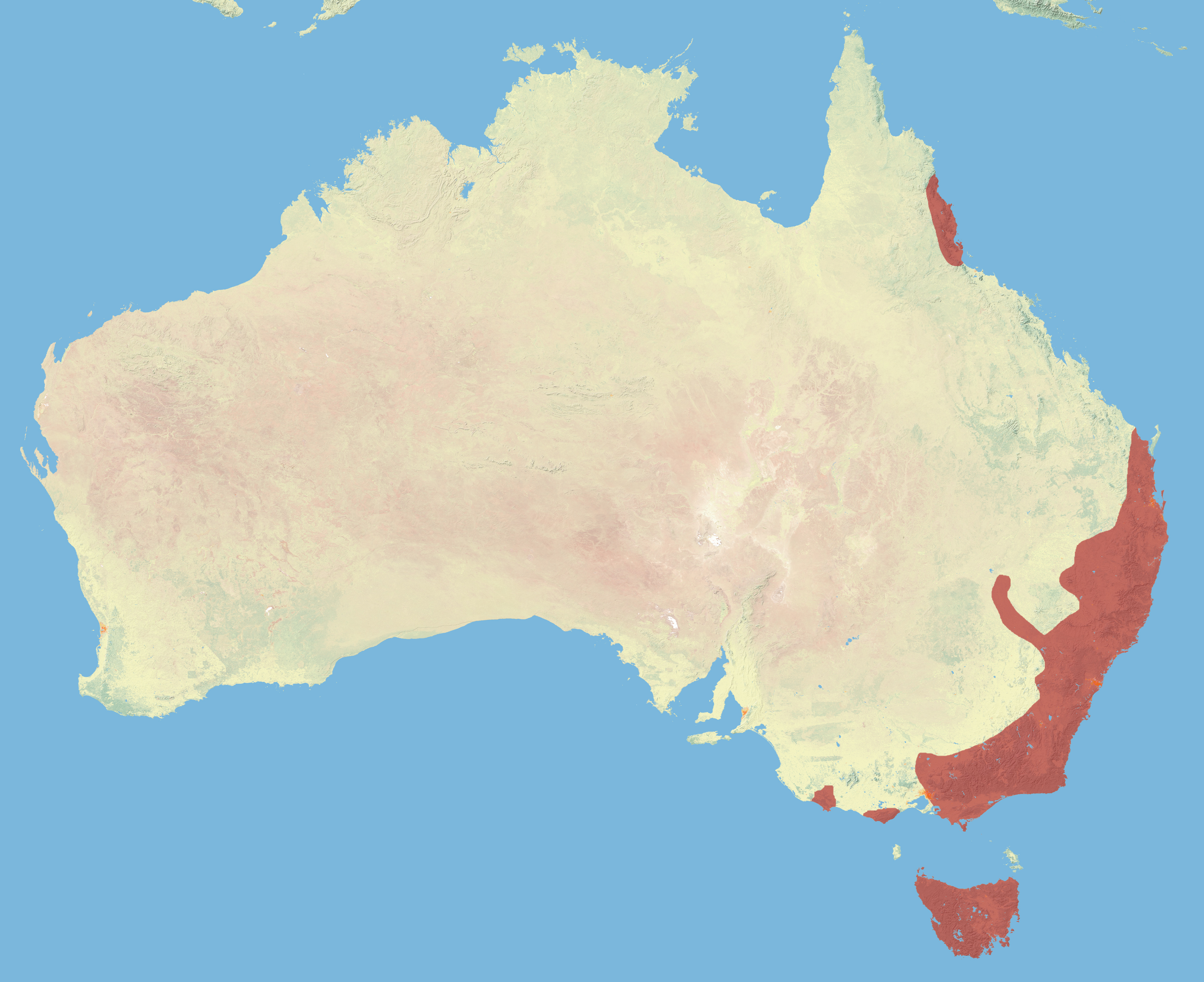
- Range of the tiger quoll

Synonyms
- Dasyurops maculatus

= Tiger quoll =

Species of carnivorous marsupial

The tiger quoll (Dasyurus maculatus), also known as the spotted-tailed quoll, spotted quoll, spotted-tailed dasyure, or tiger cat, is a carnivorous marsupial of the quoll genus Dasyurus native to Australia. With males and females weighing around 3.5 and 1.8 kg (7.7 and 4.0 lb), respectively, it is the world's second-largest extant carnivorous marsupial, behind the Tasmanian devil. Two subspecies are recognised; the nominate is found in wet forests of southeastern Australia and Tasmania, and a northern subspecies, D. m. gracilis, is found in a small area of northern Queensland and is endangered.

The tiger quoll commonly preys on small mammals, insects, birds, domestic poultry and large marsupials such as wombats. It mostly hunts live prey but occasionally scavenges when the opportunity arises. The tiger quoll kills its prey by executing a killing bite to the base of the skull or top of the neck, depending on the size of the prey. The species is listed as near-threatened on the IUCN Red List, and is primarily threatened by habitat loss caused by human activities.

== Taxonomy ==
The tiger quoll is a member of the family Dasyuridae, which includes most carnivorous marsupial mammals. This quoll was first described in 1792 by Robert Kerr, the Scottish writer and naturalist, who placed it in the genus Didelphis, which includes several species of American opossum. The species name, maculatus is the Latin word for "spotted", which refers to the animal's mottled fur pattern.

The tribe Dasyurini, to which quolls belong, also includes the Tasmanian devil, the antechinus, the kowari, and the mulgara. Genetic analysis of cytochrome b DNA and 12S rRNA of the mitochondria indicates that quolls evolved and diversified in the late Miocene between 15 and 5 million years ago, a time of great diversification in marsupials. The ancestors of all current species had diverged by the early Pliocene, around 4 million years ago.

Two subspecies are recognised:

- D. m. maculatus, found from southern Queensland south to Tasmania
- D. m. gracilis, found in an isolated population in northeastern Queensland

The following is a phylogenetic tree based on mitochondrial genome sequences:

- Dasyuromorphia
  - Thylacinus (thylacine)
  - - Myrmecobius (numbat)
    - - Sminthopsis (dunnarts)
      - - Phascogale (wambengers)
        - Dasyurus (quolls)

== Description ==
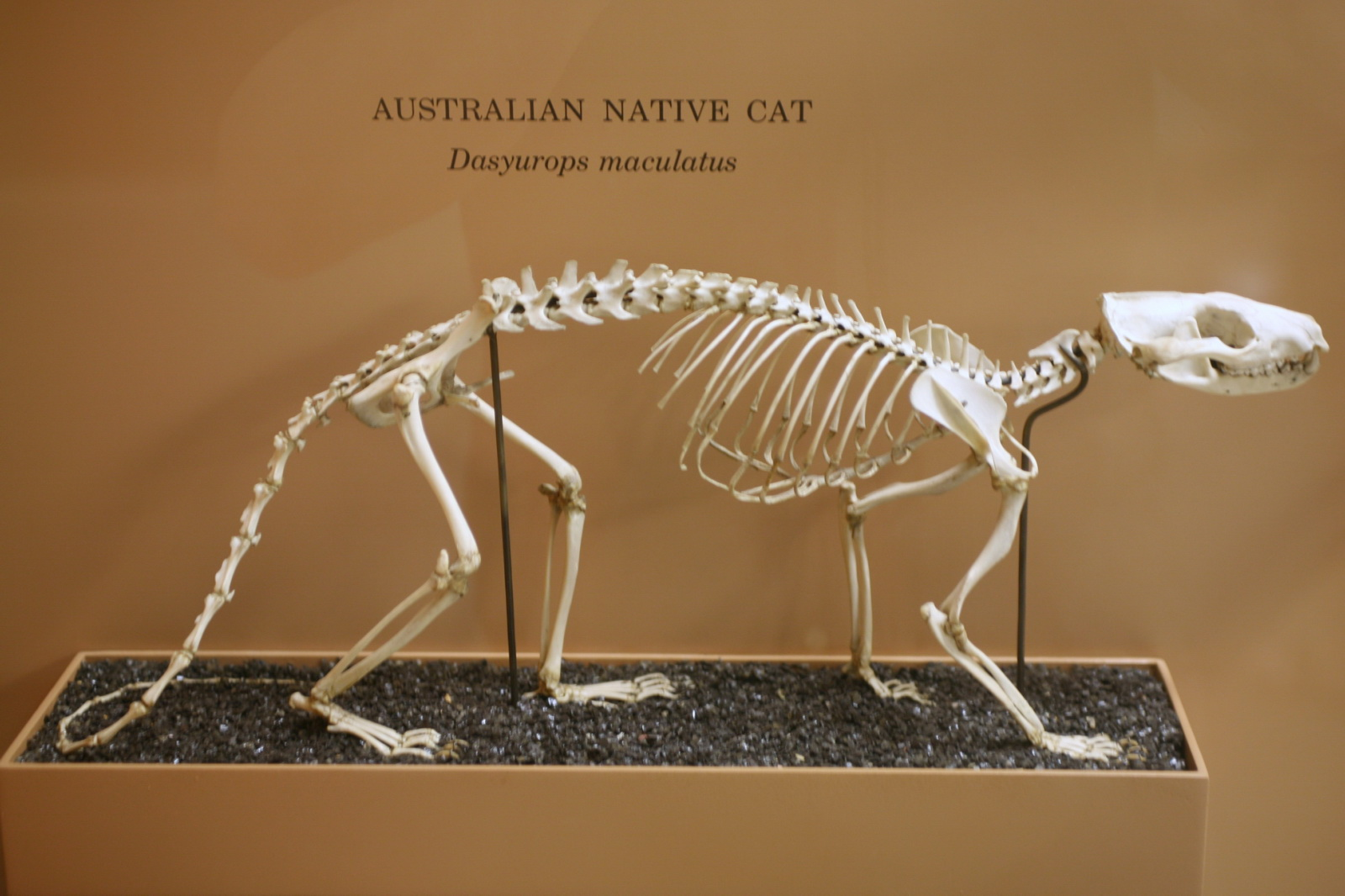
Skeleton of tiger quoll

The tiger quoll is the largest of the quolls. Adult females of the northern subspecies are generally smaller and weigh 1.5 times less than their male counterparts. Males and females of D. m. maculatus weigh on average 3.5 and 1.8 kg (7.7 and 4.0 lb), respectively, and males and females of D. m. gracilis weigh on average 1.60 and 1.15 kg (3.5 and 2.5 lb), respectively. The biggest male individuals may weigh 8.85 kg (19.5 lb), while the largest females can tip in at over 4.0 kg (8.8 lb). The tiger quoll has relatively short legs, but its tail is as long as its body and head combined. It has a thick head and neck and a slightly rounded and elongated snout.

It has five toes on each foot, both front and hind, and the hind feet have well-developed halluces. Its long pink foot pads are ridged, an adaptation for its arboreal lifestyle. This makes up for the fact that its tail is not prehensile. The tiger quoll usually has a reddish-brown pelage (a minority have black fur) with white spots, and colourations do not change seasonally. It is the only quoll species with spots on its tail in addition to its body. Its fur and skin are covered in orange-brown-coloured oil. The underside is typically greyish or creamy white.

The average length of D. m. maculatus is 930 mm (37 in) for males and 811 mm (31.9 in) for females. For D. m. gracilis, males have an average length of 801 mm (31.5 in), while females average 742 mm (29.2 in) in length. The tail is on average 285 to 550 mm (11.2 to 21.7 in) long in both subspecies. The tiger quoll has the second-most powerful bite relative to body size of any living mammalian carnivore, exerting a force of 153 N (34 lb_{f}).

== Range and ecology ==
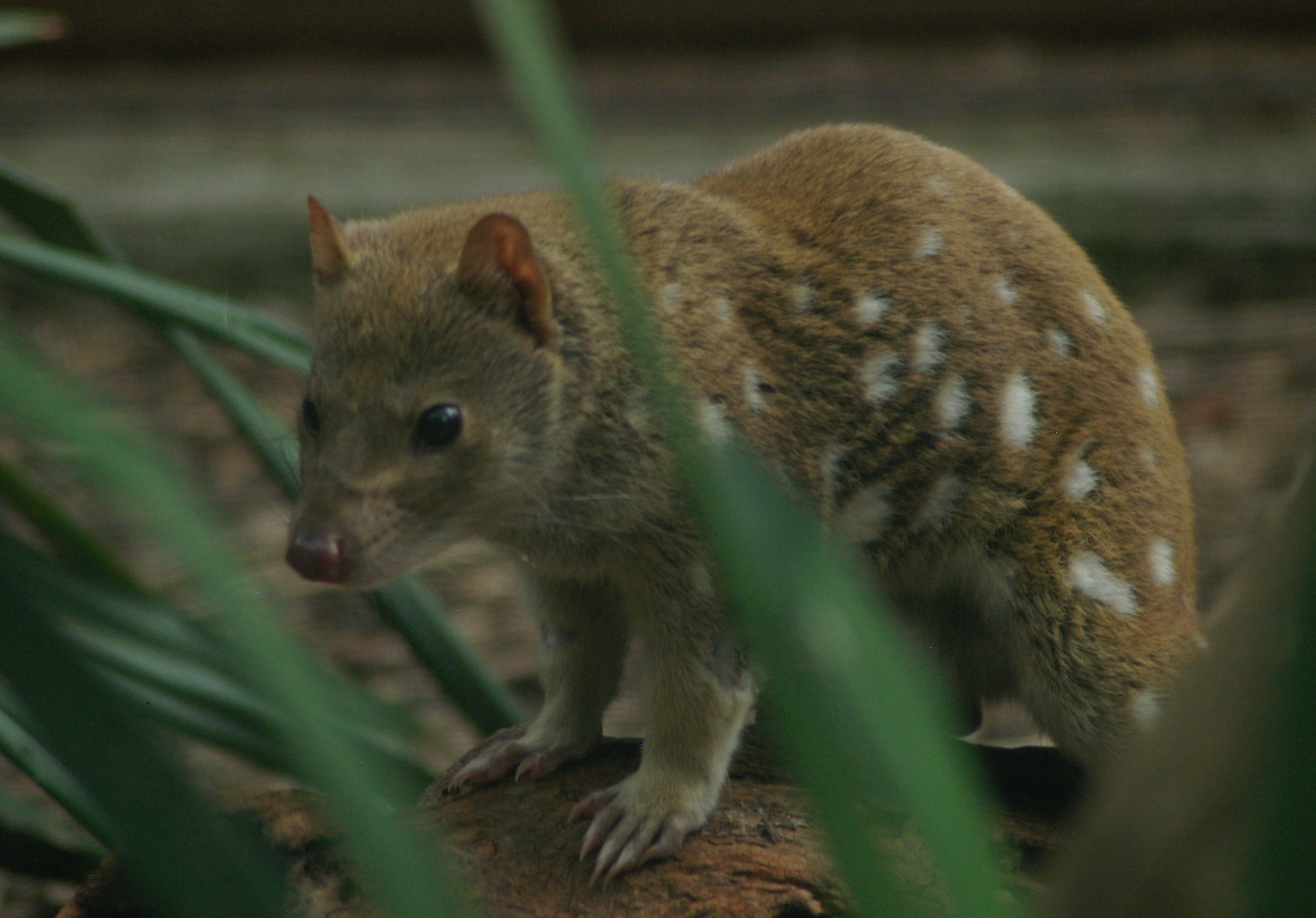
Tiger quoll at Healesville Sanctuary, Victoria

The tiger quoll is found in eastern Australia where more than 600 mm (24 in) of rain falls per year. Most sightings occur in elevations of at least 600 m (2,000 ft). Historically, the quoll was present throughout southeastern Queensland, through eastern New South Wales, Victoria, southeastern South Australia, and Tasmania. European settlement has severely impacted and fragmented the quoll's mainland distribution. Tiger quolls are rare in southeastern Queensland and mainly restricted to national parks. In Victoria, quoll populations have declined by nearly 50%. The range decline was not as severe in New South Wales, but they are still rare. The quoll was probably never very numerous in South Australia, but although considered locally extinct for 130 years, one was captured in the state's south-east in 2023. In Tasmania, the tiger quoll frequents the northern and western areas where rains are seasonal. Tiger quolls were once native to Flinders Island and King Island, but are locally extinct (extirpated) since the 20th century, so are not present on Tasmanian offshore islands.

Tiger quolls live in a variety of habitats, but seem to prefer humid forests such as rainforests and closed eucalypt forest. They are moderately arboreal, as 11% of their travelling is done above ground. When they do take to the trees, they may hunt arboreal prey such as possum, leaping between trees if need be. When descending, they usually go head first.

Prey items eaten by quolls include insects, crayfish, lizards, snakes, birds, domestic poultry, smaller mammals including platypus, rabbits, arboreal possums such as cuscuses and greater gliders, bandicoots, pademelons, small wallabies, and wombats. When hunting, a quoll stalks its prey, stopping only when its head is up. It then launches its attack, executing a killing bite to the base of the skull or top of the neck, depending on the size of the prey. The quoll will pin small prey down with its forepaws and then deliver the bite. With large prey, it jumps and latches on its back and bites the neck. They can also climb into trees to hunt for possums and birds during nighttime. They may scavenge the carrion of larger animals such as kangaroos, feral pigs, cattle, and dingoes. However, the tiger quoll does not scavenge as much as the Tasmanian devil. In one study, feral rabbits made up 76% of the diet on the mainland. The flexibility of their diets suggests their prey base is not detrimentally affected by bushfires.

Quolls, in turn, may be preyed on by Tasmanian devils and masked owls in Tasmania and dingos and dogs in mainland Australia. It may also be preyed on by wedge-tailed eagles and large pythons (such as Australian scrub pythons and carpet pythons). Tiger quolls yield to adult devils, but will chase subadults away from carcasses. Quolls also probably compete with introduced carnivores, such as foxes, cats, and feral dogs. Tiger quolls are also hosts to numerous species of endoparasites.

== Life history ==
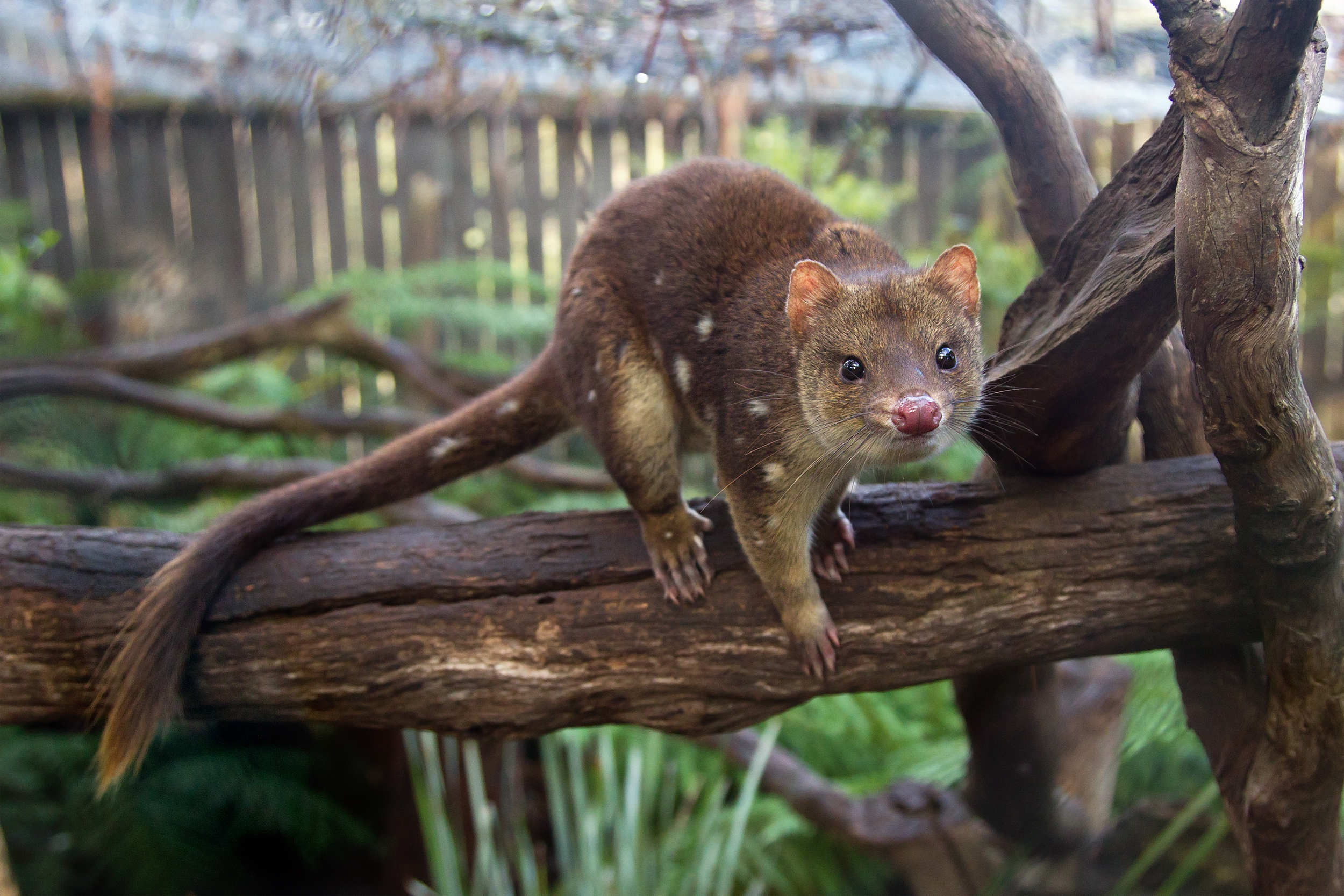
At Bonorong Wildlife Park, Tasmania, Australia

Tiger quolls are generally nocturnal, and rest during the day in dens. However, juveniles and females with young in the den can be seen during the day and may leave their dens when it is light out. Quoll dens take the form of burrows, caves, rock crevices, tree hollows, hollow logs, or under houses or sheds. Quolls move by walking and bounding gaits. Trails are not particularly important for quoll, although they forage and scent mark along runways and roads. Tiger quolls may live in home ranges that range from 580 to 875 ha (1,430 to 2,160 acres) for males and 90–188 ha (220–460 acres) for females. Most resident quolls are female, although one population study found both males and females were split between transients and residents. Males have overlapping home ranges, but each has its own core area of at least 128 ha (320 acres). The home ranges of females may overlap less. Tiger quolls have been recorded traveling 3 to 5 km (1.9 to 3.1 mi) per day in search of food and other resources. Quolls sometimes share dens during the breeding season. After copulation, females act aggressively towards males, especially when close to parturition. For the tiger quoll, olfactory and auditory signals are used more often than visual signals when communicating. Quolls greet each other with nose-to-nose sniffs, and males will sniff the backsides of females to check for estrus. Quolls also mark themselves with mouth and ear secretions. Some populations have communal latrines, while others do not. Rocky creek beds, cliff bases, and roads serve as locations for latrines.

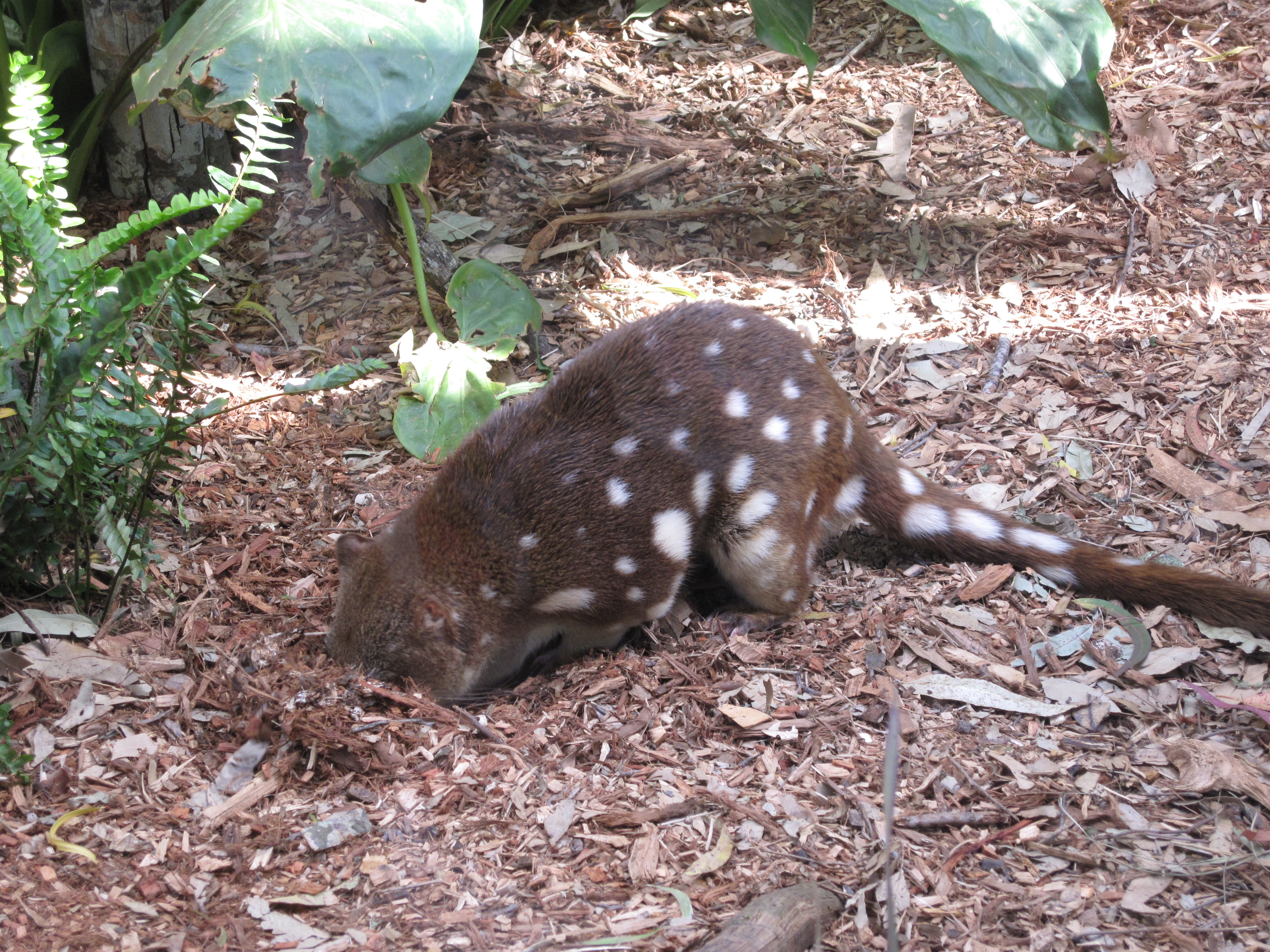
Digging a den

Adult quolls are rarely vocal outside of social interactions. Antagonistic or disturbed vocalisations are guttural huffs, coughs, hisses, and piercing screams. "Cp-cp-cp" sounds are produced by females in estrus. Females communicate with their young with "chh-chh" and "echh-echh" calls. The former are made by females and the latter are made by young. When conflict erupts among juveniles, a range of vocalisations are continuously emitted, and when clambering over their mother, she'll emit a "hiss". During antagonistic encounters, quolls also threaten each other with open mouths and teeth displays. At this time, the ears are laid back and the eyes are narrowed. Males grasp and bite each other in combat.

Tiger quolls reproduce seasonally. They mate in midwinter (June/July), but females can breed as early as April. Males are not involved in parenting, with females bearing full responsibility. The mating behaviour of the tiger quoll is unique among the quoll species in that the female vocalises when in estrus and easily accepts the male's mounting. In addition, the female's neck swells up. Mating involves the male holding on the female's sides with his paws and holding on the neck with his mouth. Polyestrous, females are in heat for an average of 3 to 5 days within a 28-day cycle. Copulation can last as long as 24 hours. Succeeding a 3-week gestation period, females give birth with their hindquarters raised and their tails curled. Around 2 to 6 young are born, starting life at only 7 mm, and increasing in size by more than 5 times during their first month. For the time the young is in the pouch, a female rests on her sides. After the young has left the pouch, females stay in nests they have built. For their first 50–60 days of life, the young cannot see, so they rely on vocalisations and touch to find their mother or siblings. It stops when their eyes open after 70 days. Young are not carried on the back, but they do rest on their mother and cling to her when frightened. By 100 days the young become more independent of their mothers, and the mothers more aggressive towards their young. Males reach physical maturity at the age of three, and females at two. Both sexes attain sexual maturity at the about same age; one year. They do not usually last more than around three years in the wild.

== Conservation status ==
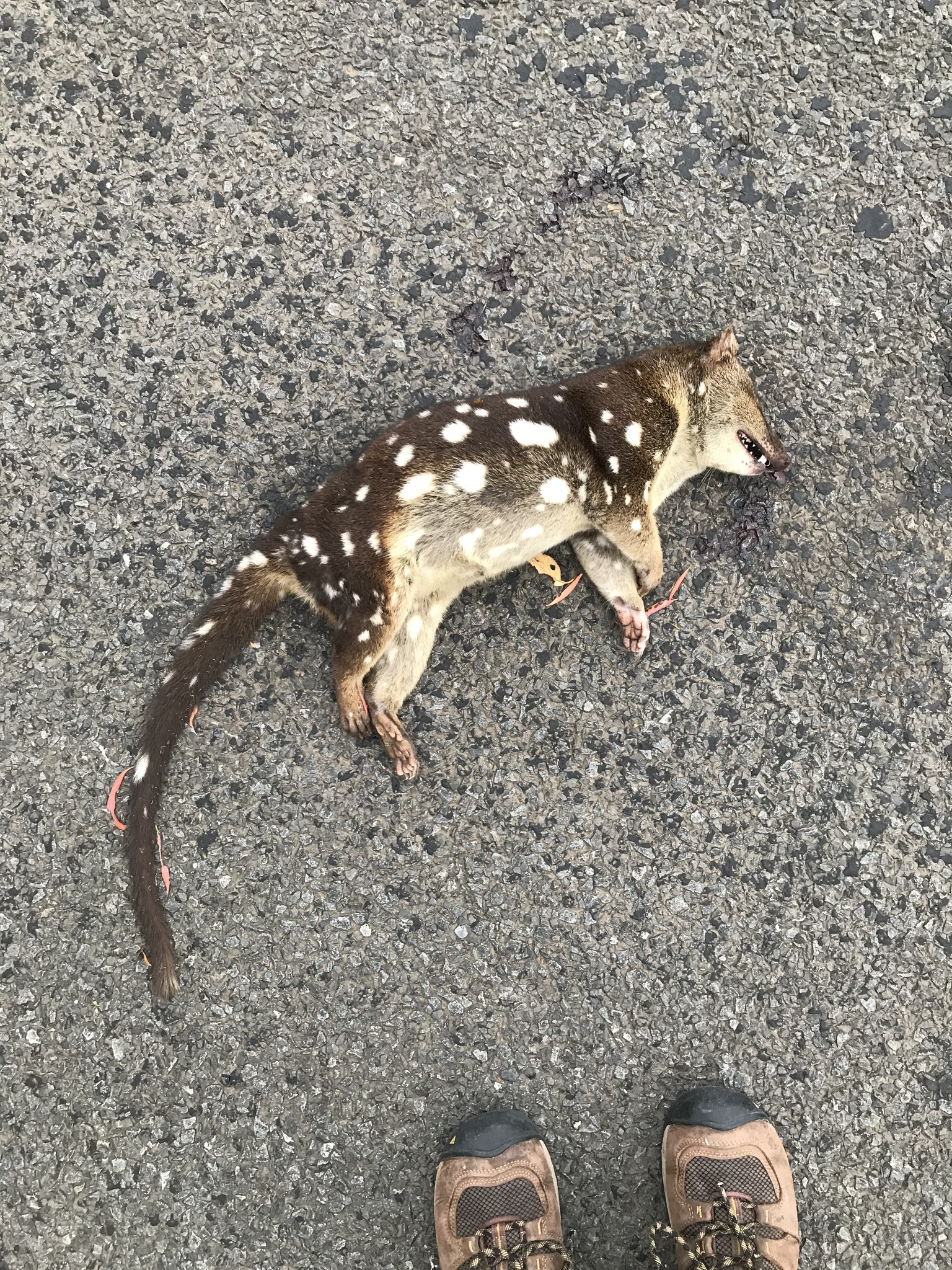
Tiger quoll roadkill on Tasmania's Bass Highway

The tiger quoll is listed by the IUCN on the Red List of Threatened Species with the status "near threatened". As of 2023, since its listing in 2004 under the EPBC Act, the Tasmanian population of Dasyurus maculatus maculatus is regarded as a vulnerable species, while the Queensland population of Dasyurus maculatus gracilis has been listed as endangered since July 2000. An estimated 14,000 mature tiger quolls are left in the world, as of 2018.

This species is vulnerable to decline because it requires certain climates and habitats, it tends to live in low densities, it is likely to compete with introduced predators (mainly foxes and feral cats) and requires much space, and it does not live very long. The biggest threat to the quoll is habitat destruction. Humans may directly contribute to quoll deaths through exploitation, motor collisions, and 1080 poisoning. An outbreak of disease in the 1900s is cited as another factor. Additionally, in south-east Queensland, the quoll's habitat has been reduced to 30% of what it was in previous decades. Exposure to introduced species, cleared forest, and farms may lead to high mortality rates.

Conservationists are using population monitoring and public education to preserve the species and intend to preserve their habitat and minimise the impacts of 1080 baiting. Wildlife corridors are being built to ensure the survival of the species, along with the management of introduced canids and felids.
