= Broad-striped dasyure =

Conservation status
- Near Threatened (IUCN 3.1)

Scientific classification
- Kingdom: Animalia
- Phylum: Chordata
- Class: Mammalia
- Infraclass: Marsupialia
- Order: Dasyuromorphia
- Family: Dasyuridae
- Subfamily: Dasyurinae
- Tribe: Phascogalini
- Genus: Murexia; Schlegel, 1866
- Species: M. rothschildi

Binomial name
- Murexia rothschildi (Tate, 1938)
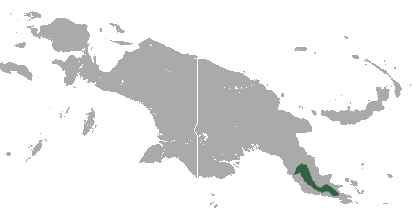
- Broad-striped dasyure range

Synonyms
- Paramurexia rothschildi Van Dyck, 2002

Species of marsupial

The broad-striped dasyure (Murexia rothschildi) is a species of marsupial in the family Dasyuridae. It is endemic to Papua New Guinea. Its natural habitat is subtropical or tropical dry forests.

Some authorities place it in the monotypic genus Paramurexia.
