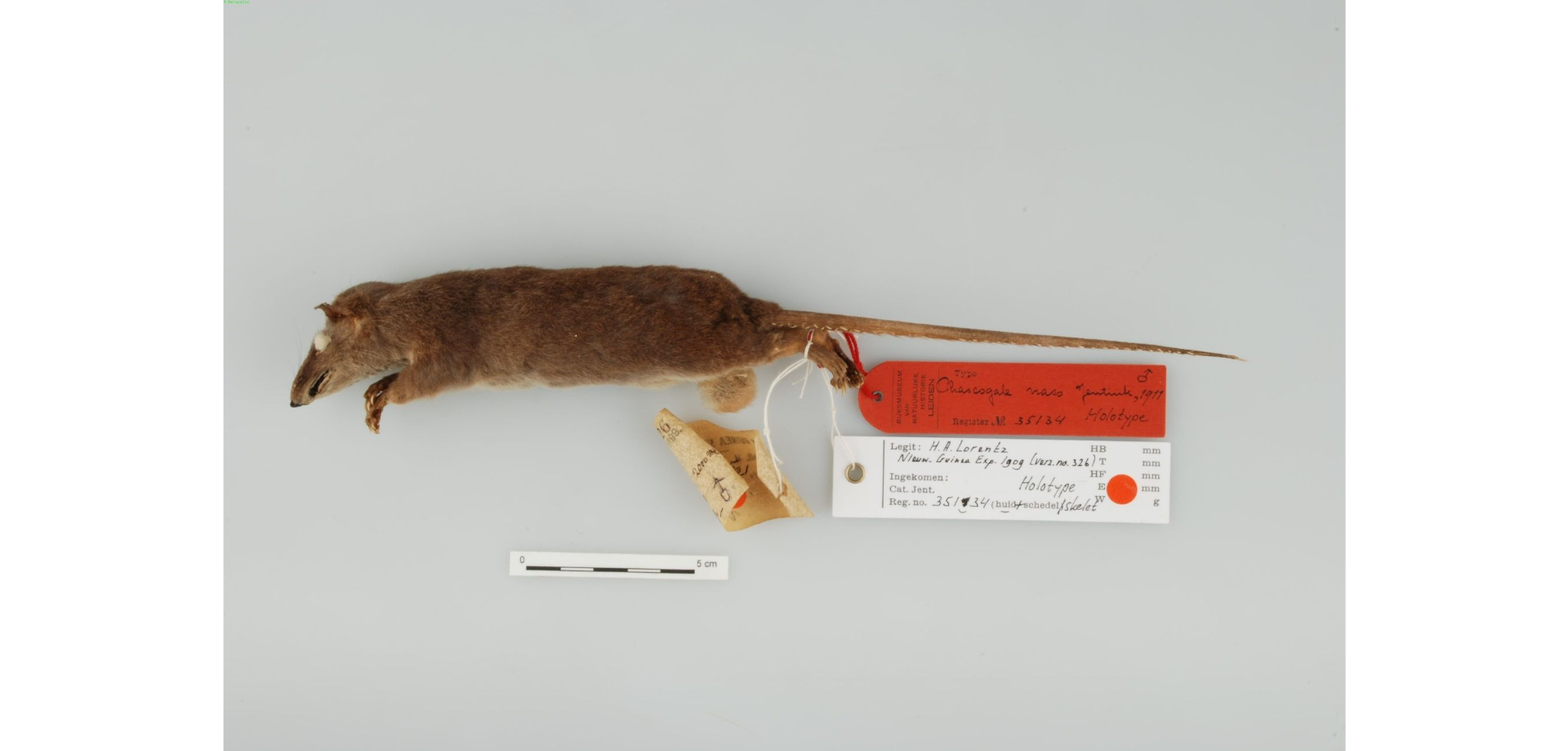

Conservation status
- Least Concern (IUCN 3.1)

Scientific classification
- Kingdom: Animalia
- Phylum: Chordata
- Class: Mammalia
- Infraclass: Marsupialia
- Order: Dasyuromorphia
- Family: Dasyuridae
- Genus: Murexia
- Species: M. naso

Binomial name
- Murexia naso (Jentink, 1911)
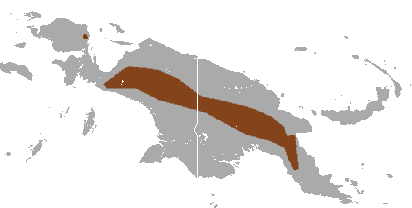
- Long-nosed dasyure range

= Long-nosed dasyure =

Species of marsupial

The long-nosed dasyure (Murexia naso) is a species of marsupial in the family Dasyuridae. It is found in Indonesia and Papua New Guinea. Its natural habitat is subtropical or tropical dry forests.
