= Habbema dasyure =

Conservation status
- Least Concern (IUCN 3.1)

Scientific classification
- Kingdom: Animalia
- Phylum: Chordata
- Class: Mammalia
- Infraclass: Marsupialia
- Order: Dasyuromorphia
- Family: Dasyuridae
- Genus: Murexia
- Species: M. habbema

Binomial name
- Murexia habbema (Tate & Archbold, 1941)
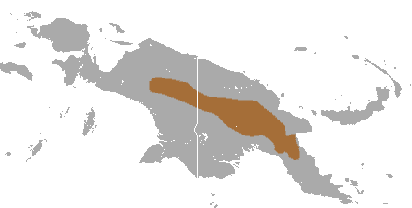
- Habbema dasyure range

Synonyms
- Antechinus habbema Tate & Archbold, 1941; Antechinus hageni Laurie, 1952; Micromurexia habbema (Tate & Archbold, 1941)

Species of mammal

The Habbema dasyure (Murexia habbema) is a species of marsupial in the family Dasyuridae found in West Papua, Indonesia, and Papua New Guinea. Its natural habitat is rocky areas.

Some authorities place it in the separate genus Micromurexia.
