= List of mammals of Western Australia =

Mammals in Western Australia include both native and introduced species.

== Subclass: Prototheria ==
=== Order: Monotremata ===
- Family: Tachyglossidae
  - Genus: Tachyglossus
    - Short-beaked echidna, T. aculeatus LC

== Subclass: Eutheria ==
=== Infraclass: Marsupialia ===
==== Order: Dasyuromorphia ====
- Family: Dasyuridae
  - Subfamily: Dasyurinae
    - Tribe: Dasyurini
      - Genus: Dasycercus
        - Brush-tailed mulgara, D. blythi LC
        - Crest-tailed mulgara, D. cristicauda LC
      - Genus: Dasykaluta
        - Little red kaluta, D. rosamondae LC
      - Genus: Dasyurus
        - Western quoll, D. geoffroii NT
        - Northern quoll, D. hallucatus EN
      - Genus: Parantechinus
        - Dibbler, P. apicalis EN
      - Genus: Pseudantechinus
        - Fat-tailed false antechinus, P. macdonnellensis LC
        - Ningbing false antechinus, P. ningbing LC
        - Rory Cooper's false antechinus, P. roryi LC
        - Woolley's false antechinus, P. woolleyae LC
    - Tribe: Phascogalini
      - Genus: Antechinus
        - Yellow-footed antechinus, A. flavipes LC
      - Genus: Phascogale
        - Red-tailed phascogale, P. calura NT
        - Brush-tailed phascogale, P. tapoatafa NT
  - Subfamily: Sminthopsinae
    - Tribe: Planigalini
      - Genus: Planigale
        - Long-tailed planigale, P. ingrami LC
        - Common planigale, P. maculata LC
    - Tribe: Sminthopsini
      - Genus: Antechinomys
        - Kultarr, A. laniger LC
      - Genus: Ningaui
        - Wongai ningaui, N. ridei LC
        - Pilbara ningaui, N. timealeyi LC
        - Southern ningaui, N. yvonneae LC
      - Genus: Sminthopsis
        - Carpentarian dunnart, S. butleri VU
        - Fat-tailed dunnart, S. crassicaudata LC
        - Little long-tailed dunnart, S. dolichura LC
        - Gilbert's dunnart, S. gilberti LC
        - White-tailed dunnart, S. granulipes LC
        - Grey-bellied dunnart, S. griseoventer LC
        - Hairy-footed dunnart, S. hirtipes LC
        - Long-tailed dunnart, S. longicaudata LC
        - Stripe-faced dunnart, S. macroura LC
        - Ooldea dunnart, S. ooldea LC
        - Sandhill dunnart, S. psammophila EN
        - Red-cheeked dunnart, S. virginiae LC
        - Lesser hairy-footed dunnart, S. youngsoni LC
- Family: Myrmecobiidae
      - Genus: Myrmecobius
        - Numbat, M. fasciatus EN

==== Order: Peramelemorphia ====
- Family: Chaeropodidae
  - Genus: Chaeropus
    - Pig-footed bandicoot, Chaeropus ecaudatus EX
- Family: Peramelidae
  - Genus: Isoodon
    - Golden bandicoot, Isoodon auratus VU
    - Northern brown bandicoot, Isoodon macrourus LC
    - Southern brown bandicoot, Isoodon obesulus LC
  - Genus: Perameles
    - Western barred bandicoot, Perameles bougainville EN
    - Desert bandicoot, Perameles eremiana EX
- Family: Thylacomyidae
  - Genus: Macrotis
    - Greater bilby, Macrotis lagotis VU
    - Lesser bilby, Macrotis leucura EX

==== Order: Notoryctemorphia ====
- Family: Notoryctidae
  - Genus: Notoryctes
    - Northern marsupial mole, Notoryctes caurinus DD
    - Southern marsupial mole, Notoryctes typhlops DD

=== Order: Diprotodontia ===
- Suborder: Macropodiformes
  - Family: Potoroidae
    - Genus: Bettongia
- Burrowing bettong, Bettongia lesueur
- Woylie, Bettongia penicillata)
- Gilbert's potoroo, Potorous gilbertii endemic
- Broad-faced potoroo, Potorous platyops EX

==== Macropodidae ====
- Central hare-wallaby, Lagorchestes asomatus
- Spectacled hare-wallaby, Lagorchestes conspicillatus
- Mala, Lagorchestes hirsutus
- Banded hare-wallaby, Lagostrophus fasciatus endemic
- Western grey kangaroo, Macropus fuliginosus
- Agile wallaby, Notamacropus agilis
- Tammar wallaby, Notamacropus eugenii
- Western brush wallaby, Notamacropus irma endemic
- Crescent nail-tail wallaby, Onychogalea lunata EX
- Northern nail-tail wallaby, Onychogalea unguifera
- Antilopine wallaroo, Osphranter antilopinus
- Common wallaroo, Osphranter robustus
- Red kangaroo, Osphranter rufus
- Short-eared rock-wallaby, Petrogale brachyotis
- Monjon, Petrogale burbidgei
- Nabarlek, Petrogale concinna
- Black-flanked rock-wallaby, Petrogale lateralis
- Rothschild's rock-wallaby, Petrogale rothschildi endemic
- Quokka, Setonix brachyurus - endemic

===== Phalangeriformes (possums and gliders) =====
====== Phalangeridae ======
- Common brushtail possum, Trichosurus vulpecula
- Scaly-tailed possum, Wyulda squamicaudata endemic

====== Petauridae ======
- Savanna glider, Petaurus ariel

====== Pseudocheiridae ======
- Rock ringtail possum, Petropseudes dahli
- Western ringtail possum, Pseudocheirus occidentalis endemic

====== Burramyidae ======
- Western pygmy possum, Cercartetus concinnus

====== Tarsipedidae ======
- Honey possum, Tarsipes rostratus endemic
- Suborder: Vombatiformes
  - Family: Vombatidae
    - Genus: Lasiorhinus
      - Southern hairy-nosed wombat, Lasiorhinus latifrons LC

==== Chiroptera (bats) ====
===== Pteropodidae (fruitbats) =====
- Northern blossom-bat, Macroglossus minimus
- Black flying fox, Pteropus alecto
- Little red flying-fox, Pteropus scapulatus

===== Megadermatidae =====
- Ghost bat, Macroderma gigas

===== Hipposideridae =====
- Dusky leaf-nosed bat, Hipposideros ater
- Northern leaf-nosed bat, Hipposideros stenotis
- Orange leaf-nosed bat, Rhinonicteris aurantius

===== Emballonuridae =====
- Yellow-bellied sheath-tailed bat, Saccolaimus flaviventris
- Common sheath-tailed bat, Taphozous georgianus
- Hill's sheath-tailed bat, Taphozous hilli

===== Vespertilionidae =====
- Gould's wattled bat, Chalinolobus gouldii
- Chocolate wattled bat, Chalinolobus morio
- Hoary wattled bat, Chalinolobus nigrogriseus
- Western false pipistrelle, Falsistrellus mackenziei endemic
- Common bent-wing bat, Miniopterus schreibersii
- Large-footed bat, Myotis moluccarum
- Arnhem long-eared bat, Nyctophilus arnhemensis
- Northwestern long-eared bat, Nyctophilus bifax
- Lesser long-eared bat, Nyctophilus geoffroyi
- Gould's long-eared bat, Nyctophilus gouldi
- Greater long-eared bat, Nyctophilus timoriensis
- Pygmy long-eared bat, Nyctophilus walkeri
- Northern pipistrelle, Pipistrellus westralis
- Inland broad-nosed bat, Scotorepens balstoni
- Little broad-nosed bat, Scotorepens greyii
- Northern broad-nosed bat, Scotorepens sanborni
- Inland forest bat, Vespadelus baverstocki
- Northern cave bat, Vespadelus caurinus
- Yellow-lipped cave bat, Vespadelus douglasorum endemic
- Finlayson's cave bat, Vespadelus finlaysoni
- Southern forest bat, Vespadelus regulus

===== Molossidae =====
- Northern freetail bat, Chaerephon jobensis
- Beccari's free-tailed bat, Mormopterus beccarii
- Little northern freetail bat, Mormopterus loriae
- Southern free-tailed bat, Mormopterus planiceps
- White-striped free-tailed bat, Tadarida australis

==== Rodentia (rodents) ====
===== Muridae (rats and mice) =====
- Rio Negro brush-tailed rat, Conilurus penicillatus
- Rakali, Hydromys chrysogaster
- Forrest's mouse, Leggadina forresti
- Short-tailed hopping mouse, Leggadina lakedownensis
- Lesser stick-nest rat, Leporillus apicalis EX
- Greater stick-nest rat, Leporillus conditor
- Grassland melomys, Melomys burtoni
- Black-footed tree-rat, Mesembriomys gouldii
- Golden-backed tree-rat, Mesembriomys macrurus
- House mouse, Mus musculus - naturalised exotic
- Spinifex hopping mouse, Notomys alexis
- Long-tailed hopping mouse, Notomys longicaudatus EX
- Big-eared hopping mouse, Notomys macrotis EX
- Mitchell's hopping mouse, Notomys mitchelli
- Ash-grey mouse, Pseudomys albocinereus
- Plains rat, Pseudomys australis
- Bolam's mouse, Pseudomys bolami
- Western pebble-mound mouse, Pseudomys chapmani endemic
- Little native mouse, Pseudomys delicatulus
- Desert mouse, Pseudomys desertor
- Shark Bay mouse, Pseudomys fieldi
- Sandy inland mouse, Pseudomys hermannsburgensis
- Kimberley mouse, Pseudomys laborifex
- Western chestnut mouse, Pseudomys nanus
- Western mouse, Pseudomys occidentalis - endemic
- Heath mouse, Pseudomys shortridgei
- Pacific rat, Rattus exulans introduced
- Bush rat, Rattus fuscipes
- Brown rat, Rattus norvegicus introduced
- Black rat, Rattus rattus introduced
- Pale field rat, Rattus tunneyi
- Long-haired rat, Rattus villosissimus
- Common rock rat, Zyzomys argurus
- Central rock rat, Zyzomys pedunculatus
- Kimberley rock rat, Zyzomys woodwardi endemic

===== Sciuridae (squirrels) =====
- Indian palm squirrel, Funambulus pennanti introduced

==== Lagomorpha (hares) ====
===== Leporidae =====
- European rabbit, Oryctolagus cuniculus introduced

==== Sirenia (sea cows) ====
===== Dugongidae =====
- Dugong, Dugong dugon

=== Cetacea cetaceans ===
==== Balaenidae ====
- Southern right whale, Eubalaena australis

==== Balaenopteridae ====
- Dwarf minke whale, Balaenoptera acutorostrata
- Antarctic minke whale, Balaenoptera bonaerensis
- Sei whale, Balaenoptera borealis
- Bryde's whale, Balaenoptera edeni
- Blue whale, Balaenoptera musculus
- Fin whale, Balaenoptera physalus
- Humpback whale, Megaptera novaeangliae

==== Neobalaenidae ====
- Pygmy right whale, Caperea marginata

==== Physeteridae ====
- Sperm whale, Physeter macrocephalus

==== Kogiidae ====
- Pygmy sperm whale, Kogia breviceps
- Dwarf sperm whale, Kogia sima

==== Ziphiidae ====
- Arnoux's beaked whale, Berdius arnuxii
- Southern bottlenose whale, Hyperoodon planifrons
- Andrews' beaked whale, Mesoplodon bowdoini
- Blainville's beaked whale, Mesoplodon densirostris
- Gray's beaked whale, Mesoplodon grayi
- Hector's beaked whale, Mesoplodon hectori
- Strap-toothed whale, Mesoplodon layardi
- True's beaked whale, Mesoplodon mirus
- Shepherd's beaked whale, Tasmancetus shepherdi
- Cuvier's beaked whale, Ziphius cavirostris

==== Delphinidae ====
- Short-beaked common dolphin, Delphinus delphis
- Pygmy killer whale, Feresa attenuata
- Short-finned pilot whale, Globicephala macrorhynchus
- Long-finned pilot whale, Globicephala melas
- Risso's dolphin, Grampus griseus
- Fraser's dolphin, Lagenodelphis hosei
- Southern right whale dolphin, Lissadelphis peronii
- Australian snubfin dolphin, Orcaella heinsohni
- Killer whale, Orcinus orca
- Melon-headed whale, Peponocephala electra
- False killer whale, Pseudorca crassidens
- Indo-Pacific humpback dolphin, Sousa chinensis
- Spotted dolphin, Stenella attenuata
- Striped dolphin, Stenella coeruleoalba
- Spinner dolphin, Stenella longirostris
- Rough-toothed dolphin, Steno bredanensis
- Indo-Pacific bottlenose dolphin, Tursiops aduncus
- Bottlenose dolphin, Tursiops truncatus

=== Carnivora (carnivores) ===
==== Otariidae (fur seals) ====
- New Zealand fur seal, Arctophoca forsteri
- Subantarctic fur seal, Arctophoca tropicalis
- Australian sea lion, Neophoca cinerea

==== Phocidae (seals) ====
- Leopard seal, Hydrurga leptonyx
- Crabeater seal, Lobodon carcinophagus
- Southern elephant seal, Mirounga leonina

==== Canidae (dogs) ====
- Dingo, Canis familiaris dingo
- Red fox, Vulpes vulpes introduced

=== Artiodactyla ===
==== Cervidae ====
- Common fallow deer, Dama dama introduced
