= List of mammals of the Northern Territory =

This is a list of mammals of the Northern Territory of Australia:

The following tags are used to highlight each species' conservation status as assessed by the International Union for Conservation of Nature:

EX	Extinct	No reasonable doubt that the last individual has died.
EW	Extinct in the wild	Known only to survive in captivity or as a naturalized populations well outside its previous range.
CR	Critically endangered	The species is in imminent risk of extinction in the wild.
EN	Endangered	The species is facing an extremely high risk of extinction in the wild.
VU	Vulnerable	The species is facing a high risk of extinction in the wild.
NT	Near threatened	The species does not meet any of the criteria that would categorise it as risking extinction but it is likely to do so in the future.
LC	Least concern	There are no current identifiable risks to the species.
DD	Data deficient	There is inadequate information to make an assessment of the risks to this species.

Some species were assessed using an earlier set of criteria. Species assessed using this system have the following instead of near threatened and least concern categories:

LR/cd	Lower risk/conservation dependent	Species which were the focus of conservation programmes and may have moved into a higher risk category if that programme was discontinued.
LR/nt	Lower risk/near threatened	Species which are close to being classified as vulnerable but are not the subject of conservation programmes.
LR/lc	Lower risk/least concern	Species for which there are no identifiable risks.

== Subclass: Eutheria ==
=== Order: Artiodactyla ===
- Family: Cervidae
  - Genus: Rusa
    - Javan rusa, Rusa timorensis VU introduced
- Family: Suidae
  - Genus: Sus
    - Wild boar, Sus scrofa LC introduced

=== Order: Carnivora ===
- Family: Canidae
  - Genus: Canis
    - Dingo, Canis lupus dingo
  - Genus: Vulpes
    - Red fox, Vulpes vulpes LC introduced

=== Order: Cetacea ===
- Suborder: Mysticeti
  - Family Balaenopteridae
    - Genus: Balaenoptera
      - Common minke whale, Balaenoptera acutorostrata LC
      - Sei whale, Balaenoptera borealis EN
      - Bryde's whale, Balaenoptera edeni DD
      - Blue whale, Balaenoptera musculus EN
      - Fin whale, Balaenoptera physalus EN
    - Genus: Megaptera
      - Humpback whale, Megaptera novaeangliae LC
- Suborder: Odontoceti
  - Family: Delphinidae
    - Genus: Delphinus
      - Short-beaked common dolphin, Delphinus delphis LC
    - Genus: Feresa
      - Pygmy killer whale, Feresa attenuata DD
    - Genus: Globicephala
      - Short-finned pilot whale, Globicephala macrorhynchus DD
    - Genus: Grampus
      - Risso's dolphin, Grampus griseus LC
    - Genus: Orcaella
      - Irrawaddy dolphin, Orcaella brevirostris VU
    - Genus: Orcinus
      - Killer whale, Orcinus orca DD
    - Genus: Peponocephala
      - Melon-headed whale, Peponocephala electra LC
    - Genus: Physeter
      - Sperm whale, Physeter macrocephalus VU
    - Genus: Pseudorca
      - False killer whale, Pseudorca crassidens DD
    - Genus: Sousa
      - Chinese white dolphin, Sousa chinensis NT
    - Genus: Stenella
      - Pantropical spotted dolphin, Stenella attenuata LC
      - Striped dolphin, Stenella coeruleoalba LC
      - Spinner dolphin, Stenella longgirostris DD
    - Genus: Steno
      - Rough-toothed dolphin, Steno bredanensis LC
    - Genus: Tursiops
      - Common bottlenose dolphin, Tursiops truncatus LC
  - Family: Kogiidae
    - Genus: Kogia
      - Pygmy sperm whale, Kogia breviceps DD
      - Dwarf sperm whale, Kogia sima DD
  - Family: Ziphidae
    - Genus: Mesoplodon
      - Strap-toothed whale, Mesoplodon layardii DD
    - Genus: Ziphius
      - Cuvier's beaked whale, Ziphius cavirostris LC

=== Order: Chiroptera ===
- Family: Emballonuridae
  - Genus: Saccolaimus
    - Yellow-bellied sheath-tailed bat, Saccolaimus flaviventris LR/nt
    - Naked-rumped pouched bat, Saccolaimus saccolaimus LC
  - Genus: Taphozous
    - Common sheath-tailed bat, Taphozous georgianus LR/lc
    - Hill's sheath-tailed bat, Taphozous hilli LR/lc
    - Arnhem sheath-tailed bat, Taphozous kapalgensis LR/lc
- Family: Hipposideridae
  - Genus: Hipposideros
    - Dusky leaf-nosed bat, Hipposideros ater LR/lc
    - Arnhem leaf-nosed bat, Hipposideros iornatus VU
    - Northern leaf-nosed bat, Hipposideros stenotis LR/nt
  - Genus: Rhinonicteris
    - Orange leaf-nosed bat, Rhinonicteris aurantia LC
- Family: Megadermatidae
  - Genus: Macroderma
    - Ghost bat, Macroderma gigas VU
- Family: Macroglossinae
  - Genus: Macroglossus
    - Long-tongued nectar bat, Macroglossus minimus LR/lc
- Family: Molossidae
  - Genus: Mormopterus
    - Beccari's free-tailed bat, Mormopterus beccarii LC
    - Little northern freetail bat, Mormopterus loriae
    - Hairy-nosed freetail bat, Mormopterus sp. 6
    - Inland freetail bat, Mormopterus sp. 3
  - Genus: Tadarida
    - White-striped free-tailed bat, Tadarida australis LC
- Family: Pteropodidae
  - Genus: Pteropus
    - Black flying fox, Pteropus alecto LC
    - Little red flying fox, Pteropus scapulatus LC
- Family: Vespertilionidae
  - Genus: Chalinolobus
    - Gould's wattled bat, Chalinolobus gouldii LC
    - Chocolate wattled bat, Chalinolobus morio LC
    - Hoary wattled bat, Chalinolobus nigrogriseus LR/lc
  - Genus: Miniopterus
    - Common bent-wing bat, Miniopterus schreibersii CD
  - Genus: Myotis
    - Northern large-footed bat, Myotis moluccarum
  - Genus: Nyctophilus
    - Northern long-eared bat, Nyctophilus arnhemensis LC
    - Eastern long-eared bat, Nyctophilus bifax LC
    - Lesser long-eared bat, Nyctophilus geoffroyi LC
    - Pygmy long-eared bat, Nyctophilus walkeri LC
  - Genus: Pipistrellus
    - Forest pipistrelle, Pipistrellus adamsi LC
    - Northern pipistrelle, Pipistrellus westralis LR/lc
  - Genus: Scotorepens
    - Inland broad-nosed bat, Scotorepens balstoni LC
    - Little broad-nosed bat, Scotorepens greyii LC
    - Northern broad-nosed bat, Scotorepens sanborni LR/lc
  - Genus: Vespadelus
    - Inland forest bat, Vespadelus baverstocki LR/lc
    - Northern cave bat, Vespadelus caurinus LC
    - Finlayson's cave bat, Vespadelus finlaysoni LC

=== Order: Lagomorpha ===
- Family: Leporidae
  - Genus: Oryctolagus
    - European rabbit, Oryctolagus cuniculus EN introduced

=== Order: Rodentia ===
- Family: Muridae
  - Genus: Conilurus
    - Conilurus penicillatus
  - Genus: Hydromys
    - Rakali, Hydromys chrysogaster LC
  - Genus: Leggadina
    - Forrest's mouse, Leggadina forresti LC
    - Lakeland Downs mouse, Leggadina lakedownensis LC
  - Genus: Leporillus
    - Lesser stick-nest rat, Leporillus apicalis CR
  - Genus: Melomys
    - Grassland mosaic-tailed rat, Melomys burtoni LC
  - Genus: Mesembriomys
    - Black-footed tree-rat, Mesembriomys gouldii NT
    - Golden-backed tree-rat, Mesembriomys macrurus LC
  - Genus: Mus
    - House mouse, Mus musculus LC introduced
  - Genus: Notomys
    - Spinifex hopping mouse, Notomys alexis LC
    - Short-tailed hopping mouse, Notomys amplus EX
    - Northern hopping mouse, Notomys aquilo EN
    - Fawn hopping mouse, Notomys cervinus VU
    - Dusky hopping mouse, Notomys fuscus VU
    - Long-tailed hopping mouse, Notomys longicaudatus EX
  - Genus: Pseudomys
    - Plains rat, Pseudomys australis VU
    - Kakadu pebble-mound mouse, Pseudomys calabyi
    - Little native mouse, Pseudomys delicatulus LC
    - Desert mouse, Pseudomys desertor LR/nt
    - Shark Bay mouse, Pseudomys fieldi VU
    - Sandy inland mouse, Pseudomys hermannburgensis LR/lc
    - Central pebble-mound mouse, Pseudomys johnsoni LR/nt
    - Western chestnut mouse, Pseudomys nanus LR/nt
  - Genus: Rattus
    - Brown rat, Rattus norvegicus LC introduced
    - Black rat, Rattus rattus LC introduced
    - Dusky field rat, Rattus sordidus LR/nt
    - Pale field rat, Rattus tunneyi LR/nt
    - Long-haired rat, Rattus villosissimus LC
  - Genus: Xeromys
    - False water rat, Xeromys myoides VU
  - Genus: Zyzomys
    - Common rock rat, Zyzomys argurus LR/lc
    - Arnhem Land rock rat, Zyzomys maini LR/lc
    - Carpentarian rock rat, Zyzomys palatalis CR
    - Central rock rat, Zyzomys pedunculatus CR

=== Order: Sirenia ===
- Family: Dugongidae
  - Genus: Dugong
    - Dugong, Dugong dugon VU

== Subclass: Metatheria ==
=== Order: Dasyuromorphia ===
- Family: Dasyuridae
  - Subfamily: Dasyurinae
    - Tribe: Dasyurini
      - Genus: Dasycercus
        - Crest-tailed mulgara, Dasycercus cristicauda LC
        - Brush-tailed mulgara, Dasycercus blythi LC
      - Genus: Dasyuroides
        - Kowari, Dasyuroides byrnei VU
      - Genus: Dasyurus
        - Western quoll, Dasyurus geoffroii NT
        - Northern quoll, Dasyurus hallucatus EN
      - Genus: Pseudantechinus
        - Sandstone false antechinus, Pseudantechinus bilarni NT
        - Fat-tailed false antechinus, Pseudantechinus macdonnellensis LC
        - Alexandria false antechinus, Pseudantechinus mimulus EN
        - Ningbing false antechinus, Psuedantechinus ningbing LC
    - Tribe: Phascogalini
      - Genus: Phascogale
        - Red-tailed phascogale, Phascogale calura NT
        - Brush-tailed phascogale, Phascogale tapoatafa NT
    - Tribe: Sminthopsini
      - Genus: Sminthopsis
        - Kakadu dunnart, Sminthopsis bindi LC
        - Carpentarian dunnart, Sminthopsis butleri VU
        - Fat-tailed dunnart, Sminthopsis crassicaudata LC
        - Hairy-footed dunnart, Sminthopsis hirtipes LC
        - Long-tailed dunnart, Sminthopsis longicaudata LC
        - Stripe-faced dunnart, Sminthopsis macroura LC
        - Ooldea dunnart, Sminthopsis ooldea LC
        - Sandhill dunnart, Sminthopsis psammophila EN
        - Red-cheeked dunnart, Sminthopsis virginiae LC
        - Lesser hairy-footed dunnart, Sminthopsis youngsoni LC
  - Subfamily: Sminthopsinae
    - Tribe: Planigalini
      - Genus: Planigale
        - Paucident planigale, Planigale gilesi LC
        - Long-tailed planigale, Planigale ingrami LC
        - Common planigale, Planigale maculata LC
        - Narrow-nosed planigale, Planigale tenuirostris LC
    - Tribe: Sminthopsini
      - Genus: Antechinomys
        - Kultarr, Antechinomys laniger LC
      - Genus: Antechinus
        - Fawn antechinus, Antechinus bellus LC
      - Genus: Ningaui
        - Wongai ningaui, Ningaui ridei LC
- Family: Myrmecobiidae
  - Genus: Myrmecobius
    - Numbat, Myrmecobius fasciatus EN

=== Order: Diprotodontia ===
- Family: Macropodidae
  - Genus: Lagorchestes
    - Lake Mackay hare-wallaby, Lagorchestes asomatus EX
    - Spectacled hare-wallaby, Lagorchestes conspicillatus LC
    - Rufous hare-wallaby, Lagorchestes hirsutus VU
  - Genus: Notamacropus
    - Agile wallaby, N. agilis LC
  - Genus: Onychogalea
    - Crescent nail-tail wallaby, Onychogalea lunata EX
    - Northern nail-tail wallaby, Onychogalea unguifera LC
  - Genus: Osphranter
    - Antilopine kangaroo, O. antilopinus LC
    - Black wallaroo, O. bernadus NT
    - Common wallaroo, O. robustus LC
    - Red kangaroo, O. rufus LC
  - Genus: Petrogale
    - Short-eared rock-wallaby, Petrogale brachyotis LC
    - Nabarlek, Petrogale concinna DD
    - Black-flanked rock-wallaby, Petrogale lateralis NT
- Family: Petauridae
  - Genus: Petaurus
    - Savanna glider, Petaurus ariel NE
- Family: Potoroidae
  - Genus: Bettongia
    - Boodie, Bettongia lesueur NT
    - Woylie, Bettongia penicillata CR
- Family: Phalangeridae
  - Genus: Trichosurus
    - Common brushtail possum, Trichosurus vulpecula LC
- Family: Pseudocheiridae
  - Genus: Petropseudes
    - Rock-haunting ringtail possum, Petropseudes dahli LC

=== Order: Notoryctemorphia ===
- Family: Notoryctidae
  - Genus: Notoryctes
    - Northern marsupial mole, Notoryctes caurinus DD
    - Southern marsupial mole, Notoryctes typhlops DD

=== Order: Peramelemorphia ===
- Family: †Chaeropodidae
  - Genus: †Chaeropus
    - Pig-footed bandicoot, Chaeropus ecaudatus EX
- Family: Peramelidae
  - Genus: Isoodon
    - Golden bandicoot, Isoodon auratus VU
    - Northern brown bandicoot, Isoodon macrourus LC
  - Genus: Perameles
    - Desert bandicoot, Perameles eremiana EX
- Family: Thylacomyidae
  - Genus: Macrotis
    - Greater bilby, Macrotis lagotis VU
    - Lesser bilby, Macrotis leucura EX

== Subclass: Prototheria ==
=== Order: Monotremata ===
- Family: Tachyglossidae
  - Genus: Tachyglossus
    - Short-beaked echidna, Tachyglossus aculeatus LC
