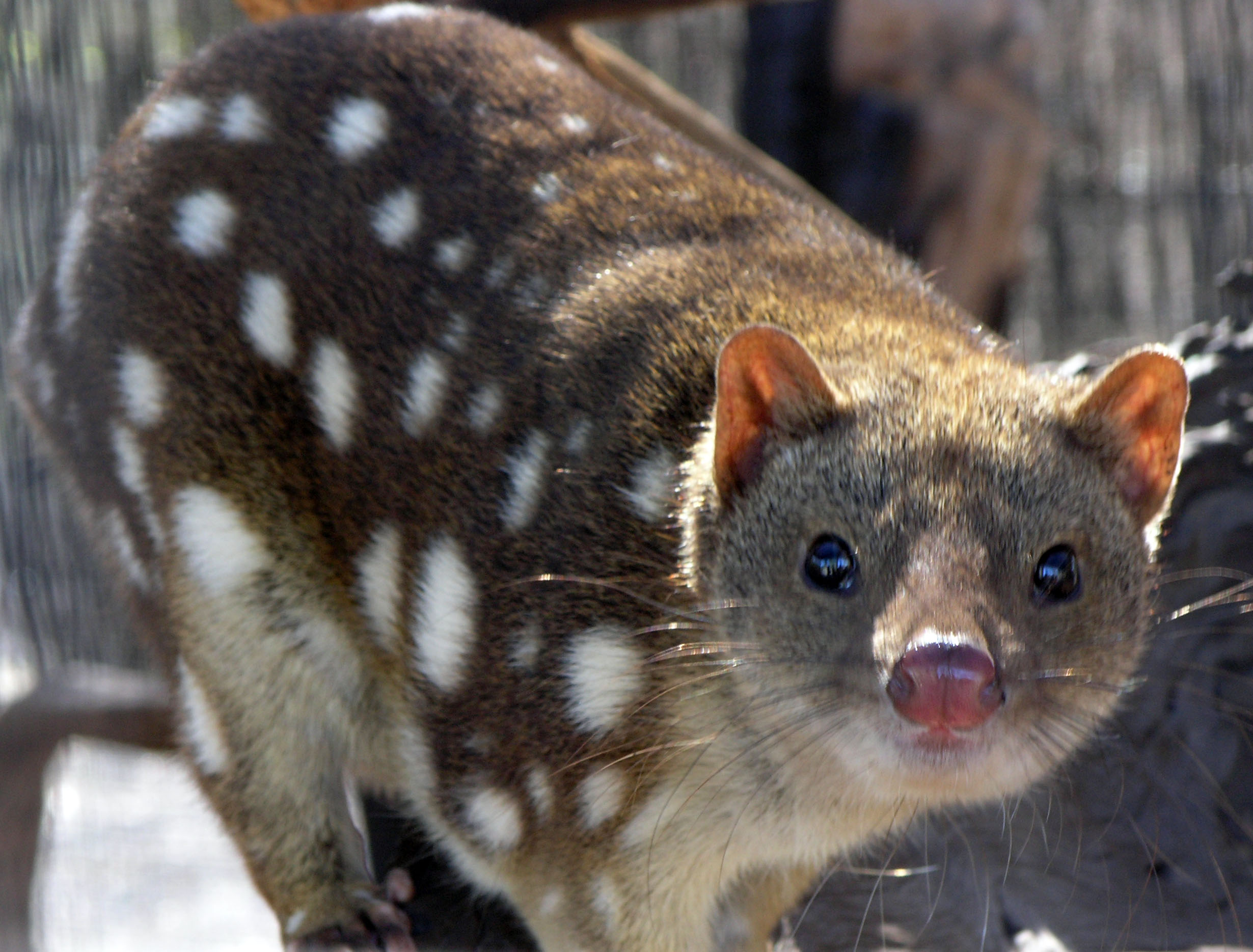
- Tiger quoll

Scientific classification
- Domain: Eukaryota
- Kingdom: Animalia
- Phylum: Chordata
- Class: Mammalia
- Infraclass: Marsupialia
- Order: Dasyuromorphia
- Family: Dasyuridae
- Subfamily: Dasyurinae
- Tribe: Dasyurini; Goldfuss, 1820

Genera
- Dasycercus; Dasykalua; Dasyuroides; Dasyurus; Myoictis; Neophascogale; Parantechinus; Phascolosorex; Pseudantechinus; Sarcophilus

= Dasyurini =

Tribe of marsupials

The tribe Dasyurini includes several genera of small carnivorous marsupials native to Australia: quolls, kowari, mulgara, kaluta, dibblers, neophascogales, pseudantechinuses, and the Tasmanian devil.

== Classification ==
- Tribe Dasyurini
  - Genus Dasycercus
    - Brush-tailed mulgara, Dasycercus blythi
    - Crest-tailed mulgara, Dasycercus cristicauda
  - Genus Dasykaluta
    - Little red kaluta, Dasykaluta rosamondae
  - Genus Dasyuroides
    - Kowari, Dasyuroides byrnei
  - Genus Dasyurus: quolls
    - New Guinean quoll, Dasyurus albopunctatus
    - Western quoll, Dasyurus geoffroii
    - Northern quoll, Dasyurus hallucatus
    - Tiger quoll, Dasyurus maculatus
    - Bronze quoll, Dasyurus spartacus
    - Eastern quoll, Dasyurus viverrinus
  - Genus Myoictis
    - Myoictis leucura
    - Three-striped dasyure, Myoictis melas
    - Wallace's dasyure, Myoictis wallacii
    - Myoictis wavicus
  - Genus Neophascogale
    - Speckled dasyure, Neophascogale lorentzi
  - Genus Parantechinus
    - Dibbler, Parantechinus apicalis
  - Genus Phascolosorex
    - Red-bellied marsupial shrew, Phascolosorex doriae
    - Narrow-striped marsupial shrew, Phascolosorex dorsalis
  - Genus Pseudantechinus
    - Sandstone false antechinus, Pseudantechinus bilarni
    - Fat-tailed false antechinus, Pseudantechinus macdonnellensis
    - Alexandria false antechinus, Pseudantechinus mimulus
    - Ningbing false antechinus, Pseudantechinus ningbing
    - Rory Cooper's false antechinus, Pseudantechinus roryi
    - Woolley's false antechinus, Pseudantechinus woolleyae
  - Genus Sarcophilus
    - Tasmanian devil, Sarcophilus harrisii
