= Patricia Woolley =

Australian zoologist

Pat Woolley
- Born: Patricia Ann Woolley; 1932 (age 93–94); Denmark, Western Australia
- Education: Albany Senior High School
- Alma mater: Perth Technical College; Leederville Technical College; University of Western Australia (BSc); Australian National University (PhD)
- Known for: Dasyurids; Dibbler morphology; Antechinus reproduction; Julia Creek Dunnart; Woolley's false antechinus
- Awards: Outstanding Achievement Award, Society of Woman Geographers (1999); Honorary Life Member, Australian Mammal Society (2000); Honorary Life Member, American Society of Mammalogists (2001); Member of the Order of Australia (2019)
- Scientific career
- Fields: Zoology; Developmental biology
- Workplaces: University of Western Australia; Australian National University; La Trobe University
- Doctoral advisor: Hugh Tyndale-Biscoe

Patricia Woolley (born 1932) is an Australian zoologist recognised for her work with marsupials, specifically the dasyurid family. Pseudantechinus woolleyae (Woolley's false antechinus) is named for her.

== Biography ==
Patricia Woolley was born in 1932 in Denmark, Western Australia. Her mother was a nurse and her father a medical practitioner. She completed her Junior Certificate at Albany High School. After moving to Perth, Woolley sought to study science at Perth Modern School however at that time women were not allowed to study chemistry at the school, so she attended Perth Technical College and later Leederville Technical College instead. There she focused on mathematics and through the encouragement of a teacher went on to study mathematics at the University of Western Australia. After losing interest in mathematics, Woolley switched to zoology and graduated with a BSc in 1955. After graduation Woolley worked as a research assistant under Professor Harry Waring, researching marsupials. She did experimental work with Waring until moving with her husband to Canberra in 1960. She lectured in zoology at the Australian National University before deciding to work towards a Ph.D. After completing her Ph.D. in 1966, she worked as a lecturer and associate professor at La Trobe University in Melbourne, retiring in 2000.

== Scientific career ==
The majority of Woolley's work focused on marsupial biology, dealing with species in both Australia and Papua New Guinea. For her Ph.D. she researched the sex differentiation in dasyurids, specifically in the Antechinus genus. One of the findings of her Ph.D. research was that certain dasyurid species are semelparous, meaning they live long enough to reproduce, and then die, which is unusual among mammals.

After receiving her Ph.D., Woolley began her career as an associate professor at La Trobe University, where she was the first zoologist on the faculty. While teaching at La Trobe, she continued her research on dasyurids. In this research, she looked at penis morphology in many species of the Antechinus genus, and was able to reclassify several species that were incorrectly put in the Antechinus genus, based on a certain structure on the penis of the animal. From 1980 to 1990 Woolley travelled in Papua New Guinea to trap dasyurids, and observe them in the wild.

== Awards and recognition ==
Prior to Woolley's research little was known of dasyurids. Her findings and her studies prompted significant interest from the zoology community, and in 1988, a new species of Pseudantechinus (Woolley's false antechinus or Pseudantechinus woolleyae) was named after her recognition of her contributions to dasyurid studies.

In 2023 a new species of mulgara (the northern mulgara or Dasycercus woolleyae) was named in recognition of her extensive work on the genus.

=== Awards ===
- Outstanding Achievement Award from the Society of Woman Geographers (1999)
- Fellow and Honorary Life Member of the Australian Mammal Society (2000)
- Honorary Life Member of the American Society of Mammalogists (2001)
- Ellis Troughton Memorial Award, Australian Mammal Society (2003)
- Member of the Order of Australia for "significant service to the environment through the conservation of Australian dasyurid marsupials" (2019)
