= Kaluta =

Kaluta may refer to:

- Little red kaluta, an Australian marsupial
- Michael Kaluta (born 1947), American artist
