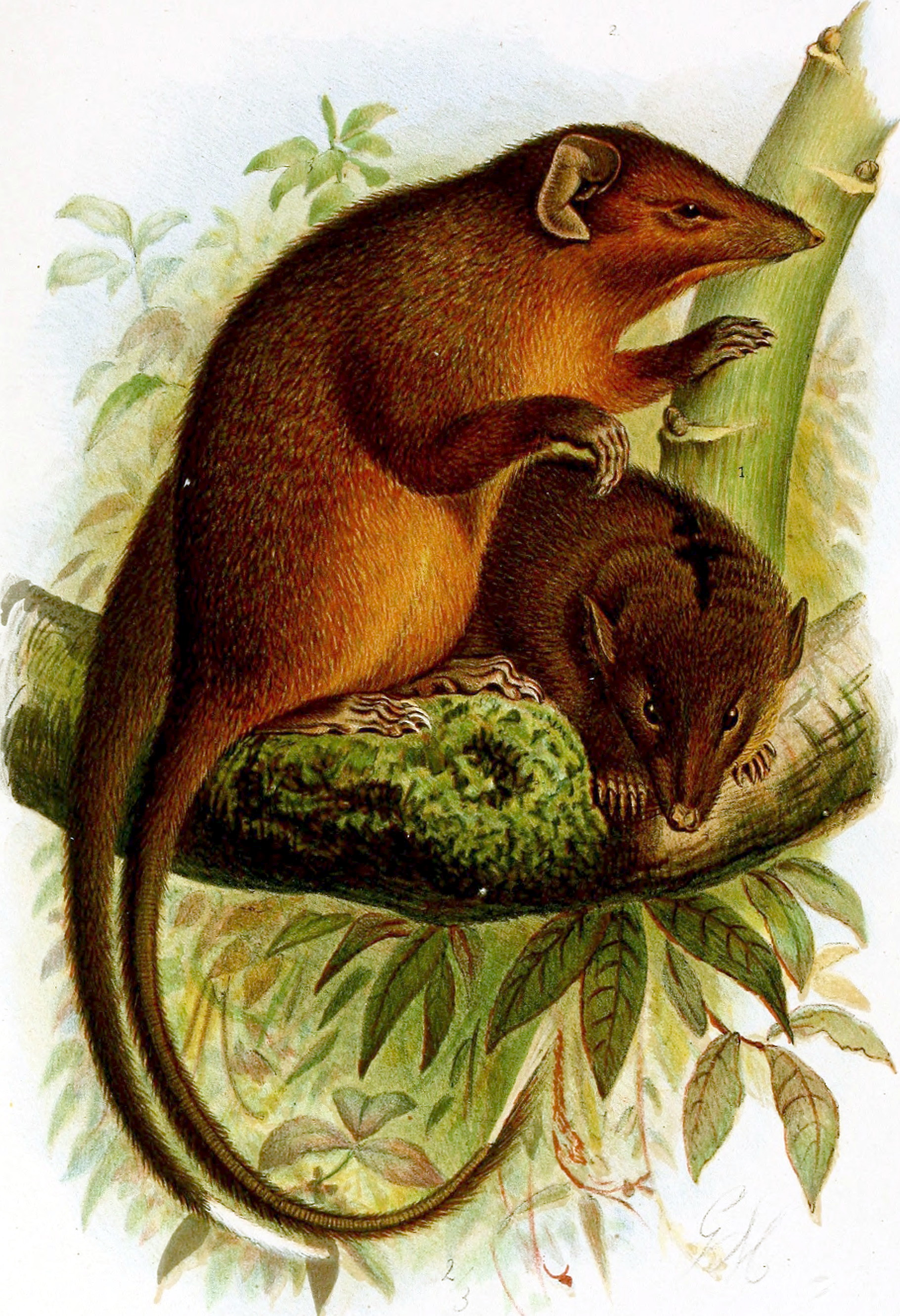
- Phascolosorex dorsalis

Scientific classification
- Kingdom: Animalia
- Phylum: Chordata
- Class: Mammalia
- Infraclass: Marsupialia
- Order: Dasyuromorphia
- Family: Dasyuridae
- Subfamily: Dasyurinae
- Tribe: Dasyurini
- Genus: Phascolosorex; Matschie, 1916

Type species
- Phascogale dorsalis J. E. Gray, 1842

Species
- See text

= Marsupial shrew =

Marsupial shrews

Genus of marsupials

The two species in the genus Phascolosorex, also known as marsupial shrews, are members of the order Dasyuromorphia.

The two species of these dasyurids are:

- Red-bellied marsupial shrew, Phascolosorex doriae (Indonesia)
- Narrow-striped marsupial shrew, Phascolosorex dorsalis (Indonesia and Papua New Guinea)
