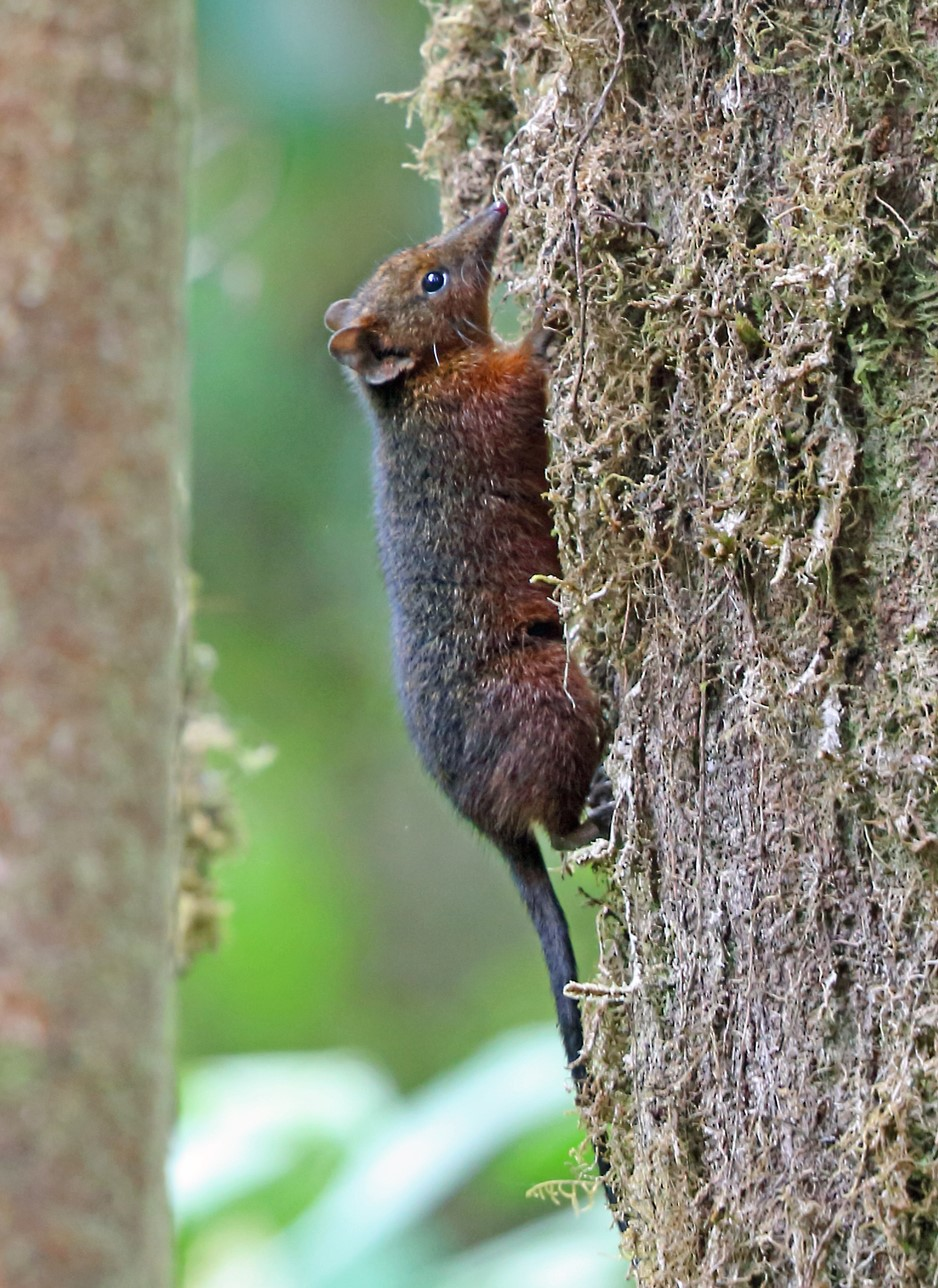

Conservation status
- Least Concern (IUCN 3.1)

Scientific classification
- Kingdom: Animalia
- Phylum: Chordata
- Class: Mammalia
- Infraclass: Marsupialia
- Order: Dasyuromorphia
- Family: Dasyuridae
- Genus: Phascolosorex
- Species: P. doriae

Binomial name
- Phascolosorex doriae (Thomas, 1886)
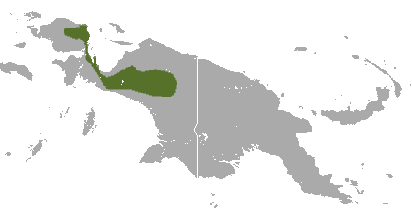
- Red-bellied marsupial shrew range

Synonyms
- Phascolosorex nouhuysii; Phascolosorex pan; Phascolosorex umbrosa

= Red-bellied marsupial shrew =

Species of marsupial

The red-bellied dasyure or red-bellied marsupial shrew (Phascolosorex doriae) is a species of marsupial in the family Dasyuridae endemic to West Papua. Its natural habitat is subtropical or tropical dry forests.
