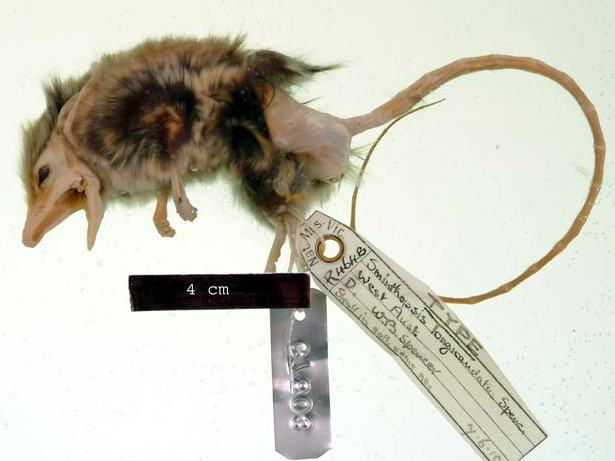
- Long-tailed dunnart specimen

Conservation status
- Least Concern (IUCN 3.1)
- CITES Appendix I

Scientific classification
- Kingdom: Animalia
- Phylum: Chordata
- Class: Mammalia
- Infraclass: Marsupialia
- Order: Dasyuromorphia
- Family: Dasyuridae
- Genus: Antechinomys
- Species: A. longicaudatus

Binomial name
- Antechinomys longicaudatus (W. B. Spencer, 1909)
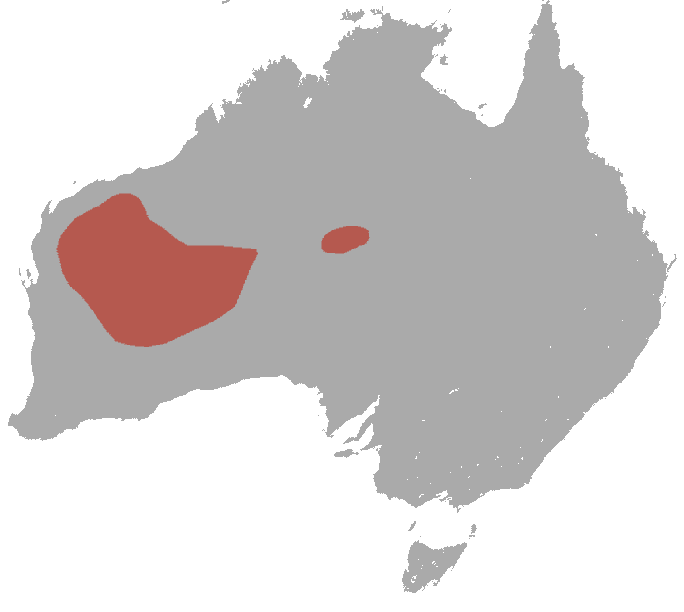
- Long-tailed dunnart range

Synonyms
- Sminthopsis longicaudatus

= Long-tailed dunnart =

Species of marsupial

The long-tailed dunnart (Antechinomys longicaudatus) is an Australian dunnart that, like the little long-tailed dunnart, has a tail longer than its body. It is also one of the larger dunnarts at a length from snout to tail of 260–306 mm (10.2–12.0 in) of which head to anus is 80–96 mm (3.1–3.8 in) and tail 180–210 mm (7.1–8.3 in) long. Hind foot size is 18 mm (0.71 in), ear length of 21 mm (0.83 in) and with a weight of 15–20 g (0.53–0.71 oz).

== Social organisation and breeding ==
A nocturnal species, this marsupial has great agility for jumping. When breeding during October–November, it burrows a hole under logs and makes its nests out of grass. The litter is of up to 6 joeys.

It is locally considered to be endangered, but the IUCN Red List indicates that it is of least concern.
