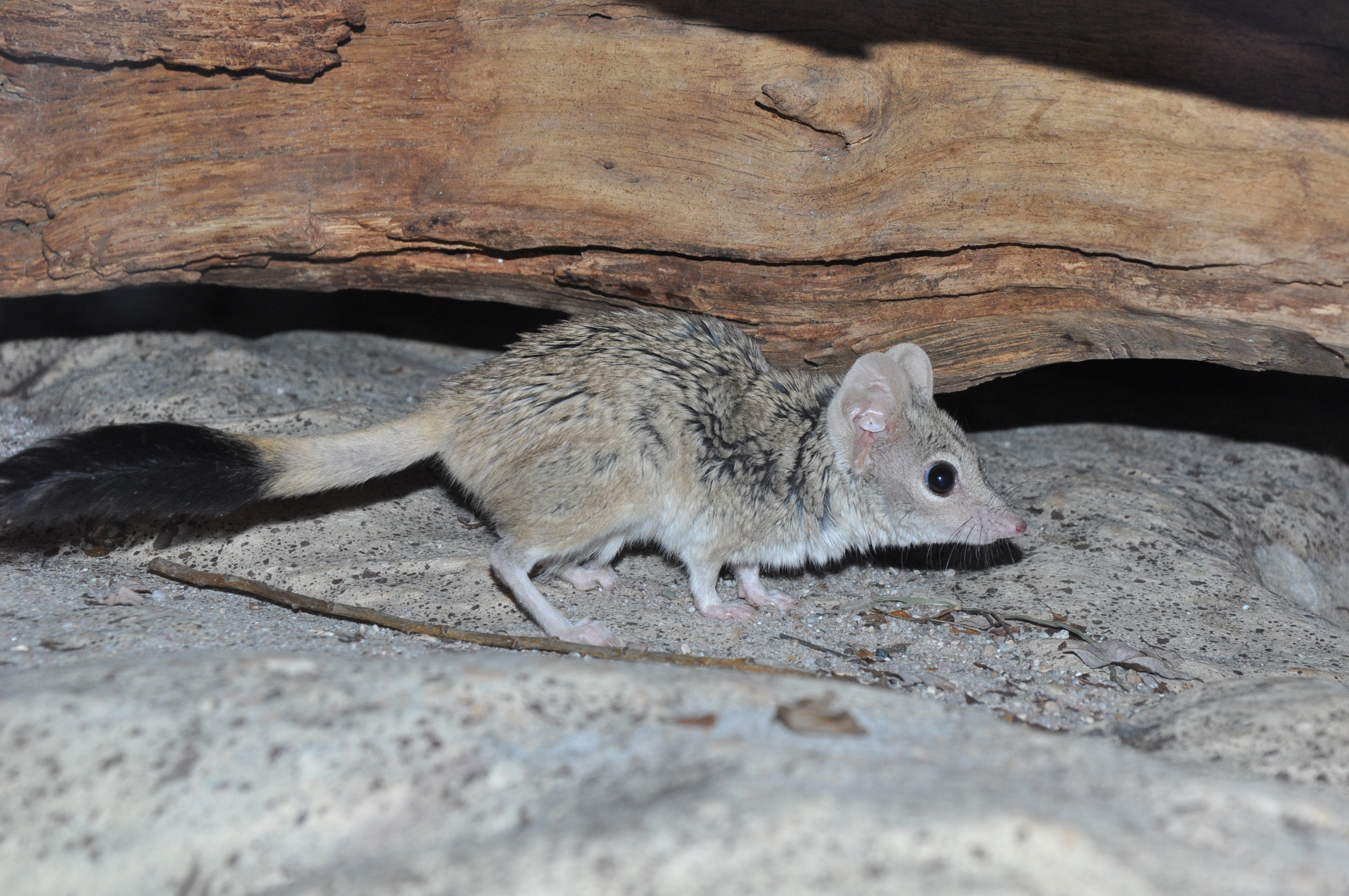

Conservation status
- Vulnerable (IUCN 3.1)

Scientific classification
- Kingdom: Animalia
- Phylum: Chordata
- Class: Mammalia
- Infraclass: Marsupialia
- Order: Dasyuromorphia
- Family: Dasyuridae
- Subfamily: Dasyurinae
- Tribe: Dasyurini
- Genus: Dasyuroides; Spencer, 1896
- Species: D. byrnei

Binomial name
- Dasyuroides byrnei Spencer, 1896
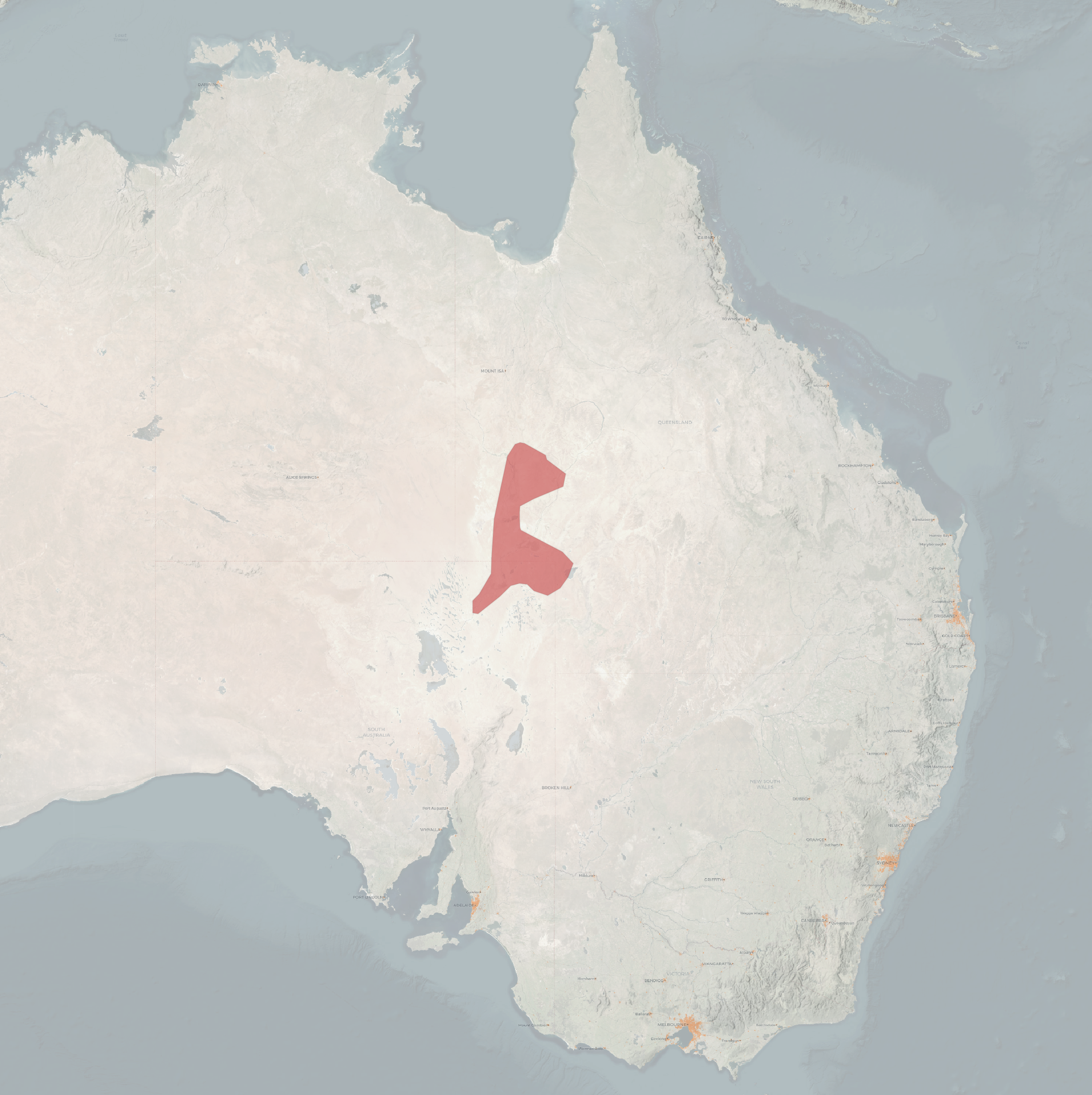
- Distribution of the kowari

= Kowari =

Species of marsupial

The kowari (Dasyuroides byrnei), also known by its Diyari name kariri, is a small carnivorous marsupial native to the gibber deserts of central Australia. It is the sole member of the genus Dasyuroides.

Other names for the species include brush-tailed marsupial rat, bushy-tailed marsupial rat, kawiri, Kayer rat, and Byrne's crest-tailed marsupial rat.

== Taxonomy ==
The kowari was first described by Sir Walter Baldwin Spencer in 1896, based on a type specimen collected near Charlotte Waters in the Northern Territory. The species was named in honour of Patrick Michael Byrne, the telegraph operator at the Charlotte Waters Telegraph Station who handed the specimen to Spencer. However, it is likely that the specimen was first collected by a person from the Arrernte nation.

The kowari is a member of the family Dasyuridae, and the sole member of genus Dasyuroides. For some time it was included in the genus Dasycercus with the mulgaras, however recent genetic work has confidently separated the kowari as their sister-taxon.

It was once thought that there were two subspecies, however these were based on minor morphological differences and they are no longer recognised:

- D. b. byrnei, including the original type specimen from Charlotte Waters, Northern Territory;
- D. b. pallidior, type specimen from Killalpaninna, South Australia.

== Description ==
The kowari is most readily distinguished from its closest relatives, the mulgaras, by having a thick, bushy brush of black hairs fully encircling the end of its tail. Other distinguishing features include having four toes on each hindfoot (as opposed to five), and the fact that the base of its tail is never fattened (tail base is often fattened in the brush-tailed mulgara, and occasionally fattened in the crest-tailed mulgara).

Male kowaris are slightly larger than females, with males weighing 85–175 g (3.0–6.2 oz), and females weighing 70–140 g (2.5–4.9 oz). Head-body length is 14–18 cm (5.5–7.1 in) for males and 13.5–16 cm (5.3–6.3 in) for females, with both sexes having tails 11–16 cm (4.3–6.3 in) long.

== Distribution and habitat ==
The kowari is found in stony desert areas of the Lake Eyre drainage basin, including the Sturt Stony Desert in north-eastern South Australia and south-western Queensland's Channel Country. Its range is declining, and it is now extinct in the Northern Territory.

Kowaris inhabit open gibber plains between braided river channels and sand dunes. They prefer areas where rocks are flat, even-sized and smaller than 5 cm (2.0 in), and there are few shrubs. They burrow in small sand mounds, which form in depressions on the gibber plain, and hunt nocturnally between the sand mounds and on the gibber plain. During the day, they generally remain inside their burrows, but may emerge to bask at its entrance.

== Diet ==
The kowari is an opportunistic and voracious hunter, with its regular diet including the long-haired rat (Rattus villosissimus), house mouse (Mus musculus), geckoes, insects and other arthropods, including centipedes. Most animals of equal or smaller size to the kowari may be considered prey if the opportunity arises, including birds. Kowaris kill with strong bites to the head, although they do not always strike the optimal location.

== Reproduction ==
Kowaris reach sexual maturity at 10–11 months old, and will commence breeding in their first year of life. Breeding occurs in May–December, with each female producing up to six pouch young. They have a gestation period of 35 days, after which the young are firmly attached to the teat for about 56 days. Other development milestones include eyes opening at 74 days, play-fighting beginning at 86 days and switching to solid food at around 95 days. Once weaned, the young will live independently. Wild kowari lifespans average little more than a year, although some have been known to live and breed for two years in the wild, or longer in captivity.

== Conservation ==
The kowari is listed as a Vulnerable species under both the Australian Federal EPBC Act and IUCN Red List, as well as Vulnerable in Queensland, Endangered in South Australia, and Extinct in the Northern Territory.

Much of its remaining range is currently run as pastoral land for the production of beef. In Queensland, it is protected in both the Astrebla Downs and Diamantina National Parks, although it has not been seen in Diamantina National Park since 2012. In South Australia, none of its current range falls under conservation tenement, though a predator free reserve of 12,000 hectares has been set up near Andamooka Station where 12 kowaris were transferred to from around the Birdsville Track in 2022.

=== Threats ===
The kowari's primary threat is habitat degradation, particularly by livestock, but also rabbits. Other threats include being preyed upon by (and being in competition for prey with) feral cats, foxes, and dingoes, as well as climate change, possible poisoning by insecticides and baits, and the loss of habitat for road construction material.

Overstocked cattle are known to degrade the sand mounds which kowaris burrow in for shelter, and by eating the sparse vegetation associated with the mounds, they also reduce the shelter available for kowari prey. There is strong evidence that overstocking of cattle has reduced kowari abundances at some sites, and possibly led to their extirpation at others.

Kowaris now have a highly fragmented population, with a high proportion of the subpopulations likely to be un-viable in the face of current threats.

=== Diseases in captivity ===
Captive kowari are known to be associated with oral squamous cell carcinomas (SCCs). The SCCs cause tumours to invade the oral cavity of the kowari and begin to cause swelling in the gums. Prior to tumour formation, periodontal diseases are heavily present in the oral cavity. Captive kowaris are not expected to survive if SCCs spread into other regions of the body.
