= Sandstone false antechinus =

Conservation status
- Near Threatened (IUCN 3.1)

Scientific classification
- Kingdom: Animalia
- Phylum: Chordata
- Class: Mammalia
- Infraclass: Marsupialia
- Order: Dasyuromorphia
- Family: Dasyuridae
- Genus: Pseudantechinus
- Species: P. bilarni

Binomial name
- Pseudantechinus bilarni (Johnson, 1954)
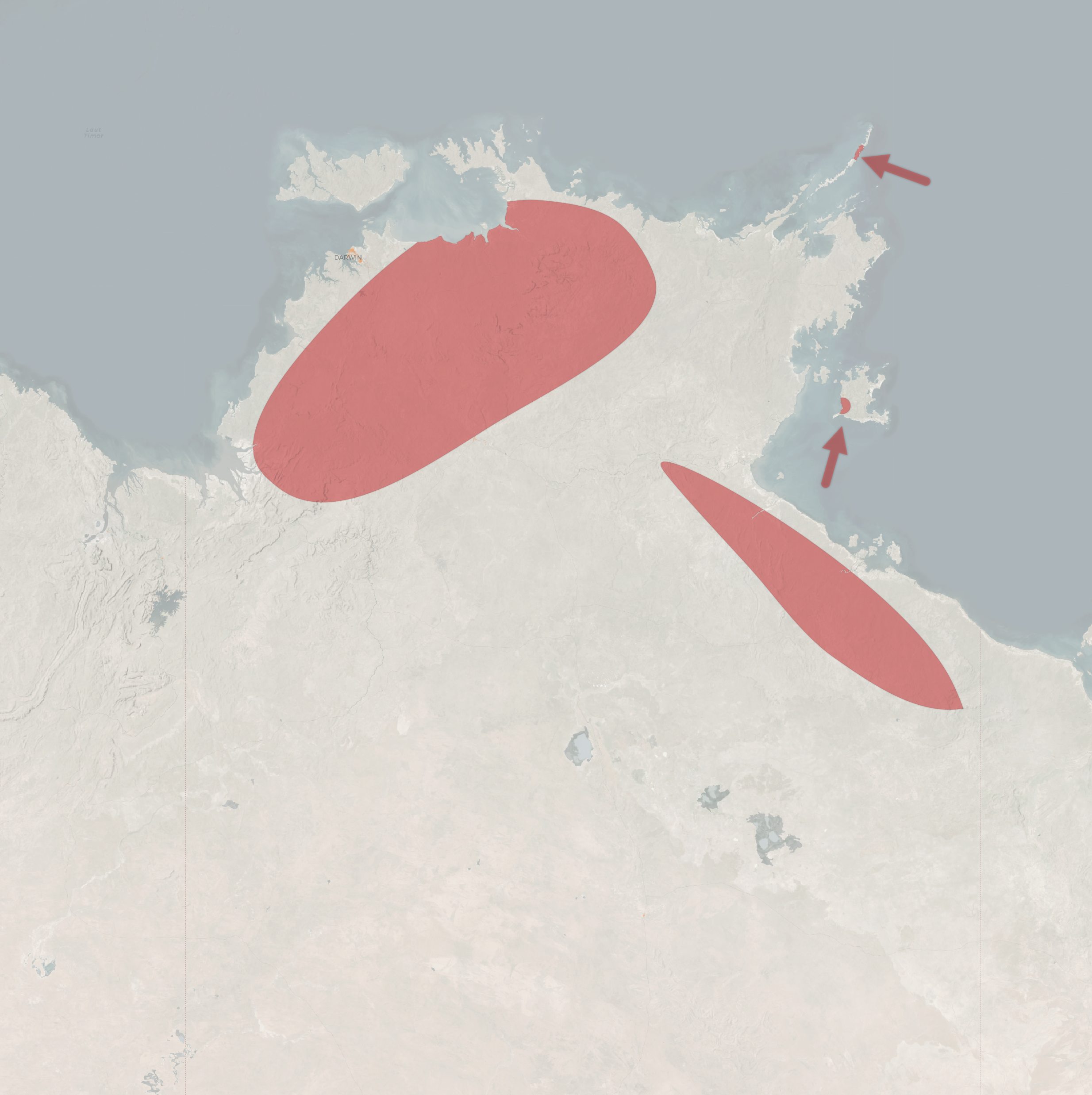
- Distribution of the sandstone false antechinus

Synonyms
- Antechinus bilarni Johnson, 1954; Parantechinus bilarni (Johnson, 1954)

Species of marsupial

The sandstone false antechinus (Pseudantechinus bilarni), also known as the sandstone pseudantechinus, the sandstone antechinus, the sandstone dibbler, Harney's antechinus and the Northern dibbler, is a species of small carnivorous marsupial, which has a patchy distribution in Australia's Northern Territory.

== Taxonomy ==
The sandstone false antechinus was discovered in 1948 when it was collected on the American-Australian expedition to Arnhem Land. It was described in 1954, when it was given the species name bilarni, which reflects the Aboriginal pronunciation of Bill Harney, an Australian writer and naturalist who accompanied the expedition.

The species has at times been assigned to the genus Antechinus, and was long believed to be a member of the genus Parantechinus. The latter genus currently contains a single species, traditionally known as the dibbler (Parantechinus apicalis) in Southwest Australia, from which this species gained a common name of Northern dibbler. Only recently the species has been moved to Pseudantechinus, where it is one of six species.

== Description ==
It is an insectivorous species that, like many other dasyurids, so exhausts itself in the breeding season that most of the males die, although unlike some other species, about 25% of both sexes survive to a second year.

The sandstone false antechinus is partly diurnal and differs from the other members of its genus in its very long, narrow muzzle and its more greyish colour. The breeding season is May–July.

== Habitat ==
The sandstone false antechinus is found in rocky areas around the Top End and the Gulf of Carpentaria in the Northern Territory. It also inhabits coastal rock platforms on Marchinbar Island.
