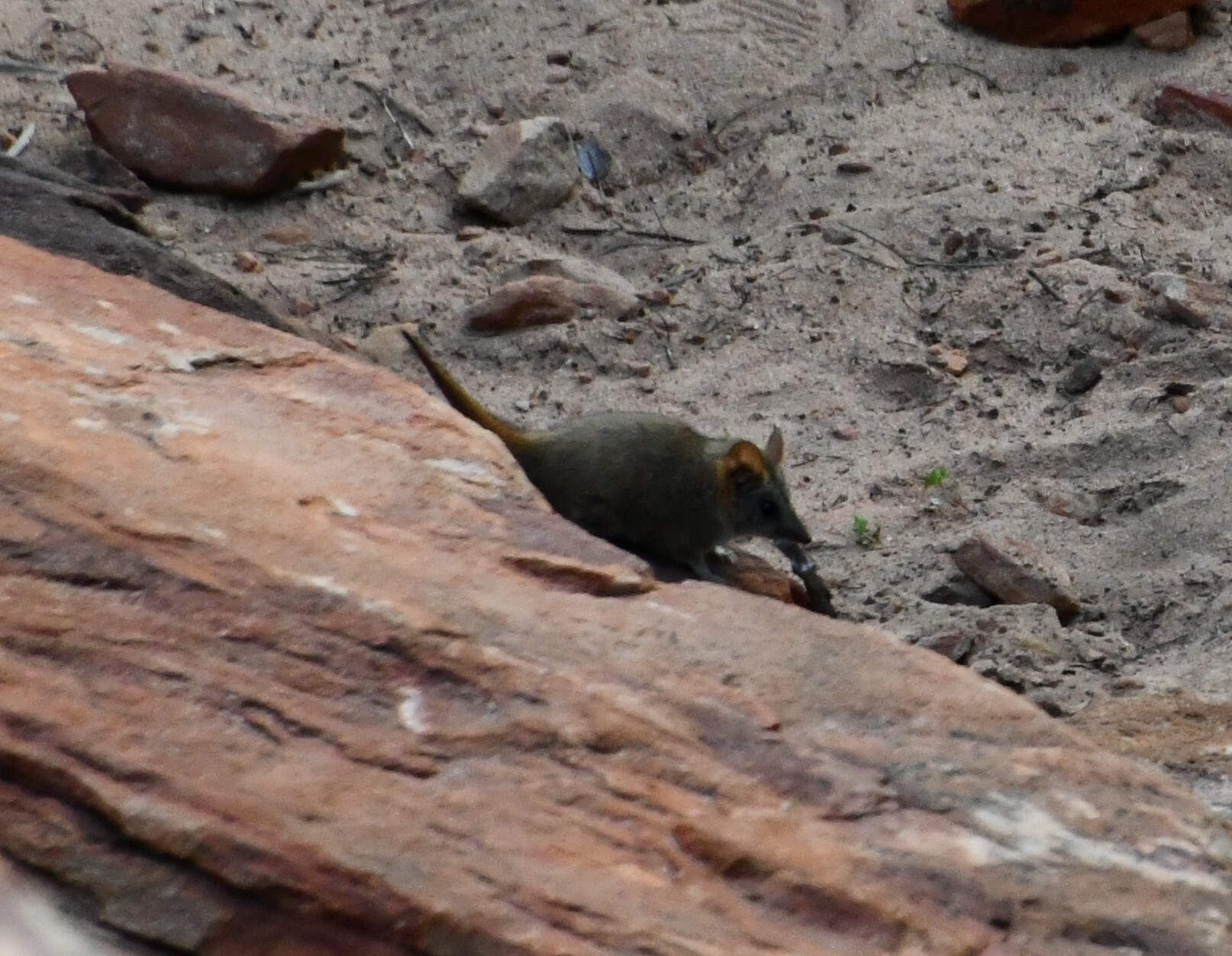

Conservation status
- Least Concern (IUCN 3.1)

Scientific classification
- Kingdom: Animalia
- Phylum: Chordata
- Class: Mammalia
- Infraclass: Marsupialia
- Order: Dasyuromorphia
- Family: Dasyuridae
- Genus: Pseudantechinus
- Species: P. woolleyae

Binomial name
- Pseudantechinus woolleyae Kitchener & Caputi, 1988
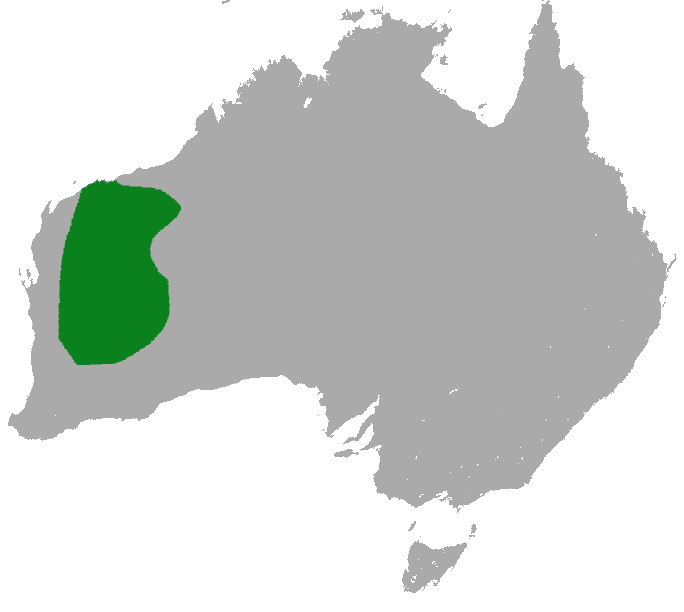
- Woolley's false antechinus range

= Woolley's false antechinus =

Species of marsupial

Woolley's false antechinus (Pseudantechinus woolleyae), also known as Woolley's pseudantechinus, is a species of small carnivorous marsupial belonging to the family Dasyuridae. It is found in the Australian state of Western Australia, primarily in the Pilbara, Ashburton and Murchison regions.

== Taxonomy ==
Woolley's false antechinus was, like most false antechinuses, long believed to be a form of the fat-tailed false antechinus, which it closely resembles. It was not given full species status until 1988. The common and species names honour Dr Patricia Woolley, an Australian expert on these dasyurid marsupials.

== Description ==
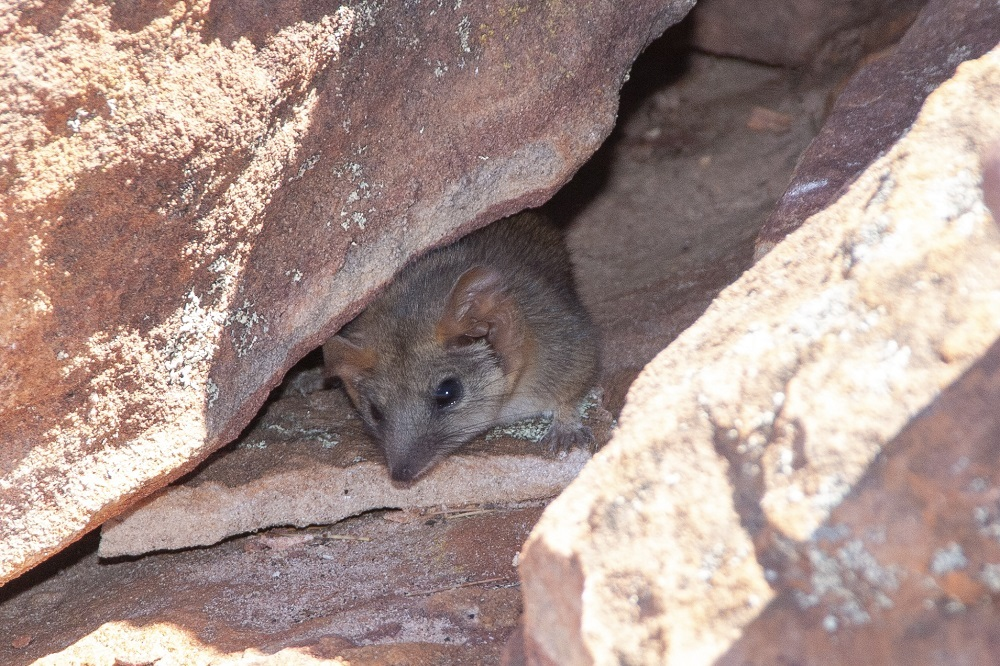
In Kalbarri, Western Australia

Woolley's false antechinus is the largest false antechinus and its behaviour is little known. It has a breeding life of two or more years, unlike many of its relatives which live for a short time. Births occur in September–October and the young are sexually mature at 10 months.

Woolley's false antechinus is coloured rich brown above and buff below. It has a flattened tail and chestnut patches behind its ears.

== Habitat ==
Woolley's false antechinus inhabits rocky hillsides, usually vegetated with acacia scrub or spinifex grass. It is found in the western area of Western Australia.
