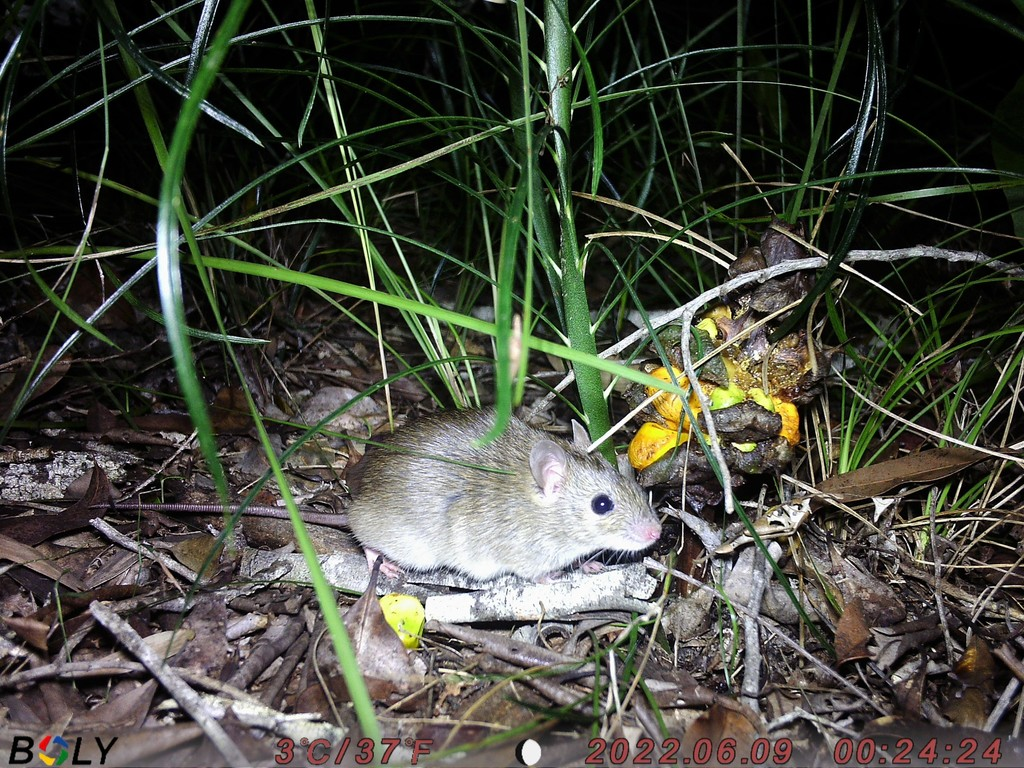

Conservation status
- Least Concern (IUCN 3.1)

Scientific classification
- Kingdom: Animalia
- Phylum: Chordata
- Class: Mammalia
- Order: Rodentia
- Family: Muridae
- Genus: Rattus
- Species: R. tunneyi

Binomial name
- Rattus tunneyi Thomas, 1904.

= Pale field rat =

Species of rodent

The pale field rat (Rattus tunneyi) is a small rat endemic to Australia. It is a nocturnal and herbivorous rodent that resides throughout the day in shallow burrows made in loose sand. Once widespread, its range has become greatly reduced and it is restricted to the grasslands, sedges, and cane-fields at the north and east of the continent. Its fur is an attractive yellow-brown colour, with grey or cream at the underside. This medium-sized rat has a tail shorter than its body.

== Taxonomy ==
The description of the species was published in 1904 by Oldfield Thomas. The specimens were collected by J. T. Tunney and forwarded to the British Museum, Thomas recognising the field worker in the specific epithet. The type used in the description was a female collected at Mary River, in the Northern Territory of Australia, and two other unlabelled specimens. Thomas placed the new species in the genus Mus, allying them with the rat (as Mus rattus) familiar to Europeans. Two subspecies are recognised, the nominate describing those in the north and west, and subspecies Rattuss tunneyi culmorum at the east coast. The population has previously been recognised as subspecies Rattus culmorum apex.

Rattus tunneyi is also known as Tunney's rat, and the Australian pale field rat.

== Description ==
The pale field rat is a medium-sized species of Rattus, with a rounded and comparatively broad head. The upper side of the pelage is a toffee-like shade of brown, said to be appealing in appearance, which grades into the lighter cream or greyish white at the underside. The hair across their upper back is slate-grey beneath with a sandy-buff colour overlaying this. Their fine hair is around 10 mm and interspersed with hairs around twice this length. A defining detail is their tail length (80 to 150 mm) which is obviously shorter than the combined head and body length (120 to 195 mm). Their weight range is 50 to 210 grams. Rattus tunneyi has pale pinkish ears that are 15 to 20 mm long and large eyes that have a bulging appearance. The female has a total of ten nipples, one pectoral and four inguinal pairs of teats. The feet of these rodents are covered in white hair at the upper side.

== Behaviour ==
The behaviour of the species is generally docile, and they are found living with others in loosely connected and scattered groups. Breeding takes place in the austral autumn, although this occurs a little later in the year with north-west subspecies. The litter size is around 4 young, but this may range from 2 to 11. As is usual in the genus, the oestrus cycle is from 4 to 5 days. Their gestation period is 21 to 22 days, and when combined with postpartum oestrus it has the potential for a large population increase, however because it is a poor coloniser and does not disperse easily it is not considered to be a rat prone to extremes in population size, especially when compared to the dusky rat and long-haired rat. The existence of runways between their nests indicate some interaction between individuals, but the degree of sociality amongst these communities is unknown.

== Distribution and habitat ==
Rattus tunneyi once occupied almost all areas of mainland Australia, but is now found only in tall grasslands in northern Australia. The rats were once found as far inland as Alice Springs, but are currently restricted to coastal and sub-coastal regions. This species has become regionally extinct in some areas of its former range, which contracted greatly during the twentieth century. An outlying specimen obtained from South Australia was probably collected at Kangaroo Island. The mainland occurrence in that region is only confirmed from sub-fossil specimens.

The distribution range of the east coast subspecies R. tunneyi culmorum is from Coffs Harbour in New South Wales to Coen in Queensland. To the west of the Gulf of Carpentaria, the subspecies R. tunneyi tunneyi is found at coastal regions of the north to the Kimberley region in Western Australia. They also occur at offshore islands in the Pilbara region of that state. The fields of sugar cane found at the eastern coast may host the species, and they are observed at camp-sites or rocky slopes in the Kakadu National Park.

The preference of habitat includes woodlands, dense sedges or grassy under-storey within monsoon forest, and wetter open grasslands. The local environment is usually vegetation surrounding a watercourse, with friable soils seeming to be a requirement. They forage for a variety of plant material, and will dig to expose subsurface foods such as tubers.

Populations of pale field rats in the Northern Territory have declined substantially since European colonisation of Australia, with one study identifying a 15% reduction in the extent of occurrence and a 35% reduction in the breadth of occupied environmental space. A significant contraction towards areas of lower fire frequency, higher vegetation cover, and higher rainfall was observed, which are likely refuge habitats that help to buffer the impacts of feral cat predation.

== Ecology ==
Pale field rats are vegetarians that eat grass stems, seeds, tubers and roots, and rest in shallow burrows dug in loose, crumbly soil during the day. The habitat is within the range of pastoralist leases and, with the introduction of cattle, local ecology has been degraded by soil compaction. Feral cats are also known to have placed pressure on the population. This rat is terrestrial, foraging across the soil surface.

The breeding period of the eastern subspecies is primarily around the austral spring (September to November). The northernmost group reproduce during the drier period of the year from March to August.

Rattus tunneyi was identified as a damaging pest species in Queensland, where they feed at the roots of hoop pine, Araucaria cunninghamii, and destroy partially matured trees in plantation crops.
