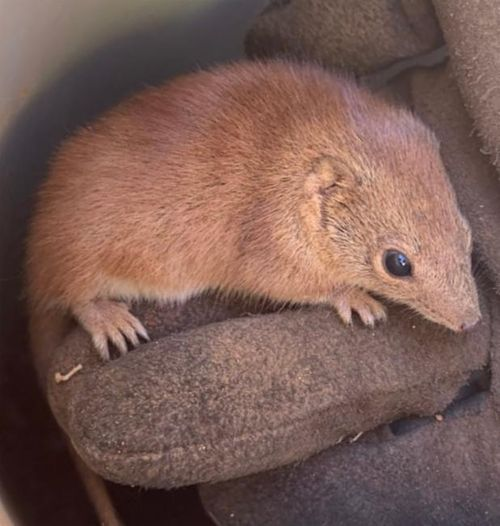
- Dasykaluta rosamondae, observed by Robert Browne-Cooper in Australia

Conservation status
- Least Concern (IUCN 3.1)

Scientific classification
- Kingdom: Animalia
- Phylum: Chordata
- Class: Mammalia
- Infraclass: Marsupialia
- Order: Dasyuromorphia
- Family: Dasyuridae
- Subfamily: Dasyurinae
- Tribe: Dasyurini
- Genus: Dasykaluta; Archer, 1982
- Species: D. rosamondae

Binomial name
- Dasykaluta rosamondae (Ride, 1964)
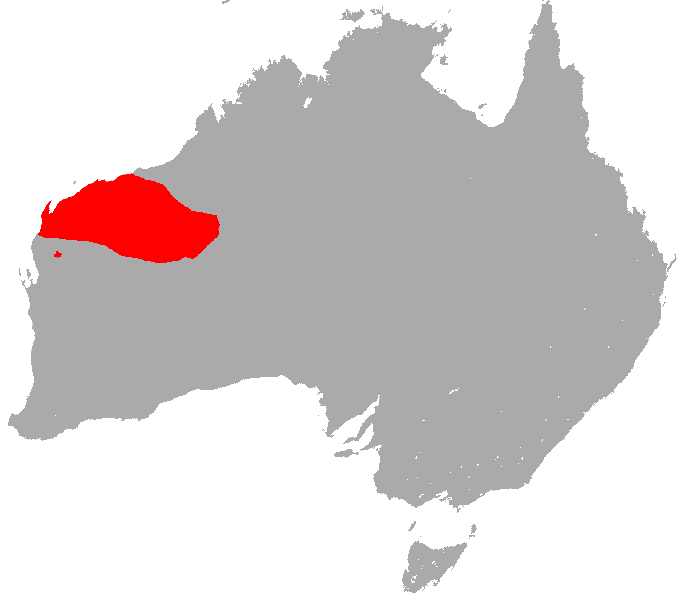
- Little Red Kaluta range

= Little red kaluta =

Species of marsupial

The little red kaluta (Dasykaluta rosamondae) is a small, reddish-brown, shrew-like mammal native to dry grasslands of northwest Western Australia. It is active at night, feeding on insects and other small animals. The kaluta is a marsupial and is the only member of its genus, Dasykaluta. Individuals are around 10 cm (3.9 in) long and weigh from 20 to 40 g (0.71 to 1.41 oz). They live for about four years in captivity. Other common names include little red antechinus, russet antechinus and spinifex antechinus.

== Taxonomy ==
Dasykaluta rosamondae is a member of the family Dasyuridae. When it was first described by W.D.L. Ride in 1964, the species was placed in the genus Antechinus, however, the author noted the new species created difficulties with the arrangements previously published. In 1982 Mike Archer erected the genus Dasykaluta and assigned it as the sole species. It has since been shown to be most closely related to Parantechinus apicalis, the dibbler.

The earliest specimen was collected in 1936 by Mr. R. M. W. Bligh near Tambourah (Marble Bar) and deposited at the Western Australian Museum, its dental formula leading to a tentative diagnosis of a species of Dasycercus by Ludwig Glauert. Ride examined this and a series of specimens collected by E. H. M. Ealey at Woodstock Station, also near Marble Bar in Western Australia.

"Kaluta" is an Aboriginal name adopted from the Nyamal language for this species, and this is reflected in the generic name Dasykaluta, which means "hairy kaluta". The species name, rosamondae, is a threefold reference to Rosamund Clifford, the famous mistress of Henry II of England, who is said to have had red hair, its spinifex dominated habitat resembling "a house of wonderful working, so that no man or woman might come to her ...", alluding to a maze at Woodstock Palace where the king hid her and the place of the species discovery, Woodstock Station.

== Description ==
The kaluta is a rufous brown colour with fairly coarse fur. In body shape, it is generally similar to the antechinuses, although it has a shorter head and ears. It is also somewhat smaller than these animals. The species is small and robust in form, with a shaggy appearance to the uniformly russet-brown or coppery colour at the upper parts of the body; the underparts are a paler shade of the colour above. The head and body measurement is 90 to 105 millimetres (3.5 to 4.1 in). Ears are short and covered in fur, a little higher than the top of the head and 11–13 mm (0.43–0.51 in) in length; the tip of the short snout is closer to the eyes than the ears. Their tail is relatively thick and short, from 55 to 75 mm (2.2 to 3.0 in), sometimes swollen toward the base and tapers to a length not greater than two-thirds of the body length. Kaluta has hind feet that measure 15–18 mm (0.59–0.71 in) long and covered in fur.

The little red kaluta feeds on insects and small vertebrates. A notable habit is flicking its tail in the air as it investigates its habitat.

Male little red kalutas, like several other dasyurid species, die shortly after the September breeding season, probably due to stress. The young are born after a pregnancy of around seven weeks, and are weaned when around four months old.

== Habitat and behaviour ==
The little red kaluta is moderately common in the Pilbara, the west of the Little Sandy Desert and parts of the Carnarvon Basin in Western Australia. The distribution range is restricted to this subtropical environment, where they inhabit hummocks of Triodia, the dominant vegetation of spinifex grasslands. Kaluta live and forage on the sandy soil of the region, searching for invertebrate prey amongst the dense and tough mounds of spinifex.
