= Rory Cooper's false antechinus =

Conservation status
- Least Concern (IUCN 3.1)

Scientific classification
- Domain: Eukaryota
- Kingdom: Animalia
- Phylum: Chordata
- Class: Mammalia
- Infraclass: Marsupialia
- Order: Dasyuromorphia
- Family: Dasyuridae
- Genus: Pseudantechinus
- Species: P. roryi

Binomial name
- Pseudantechinus roryi Cooper, Aplin & Adams, 2000
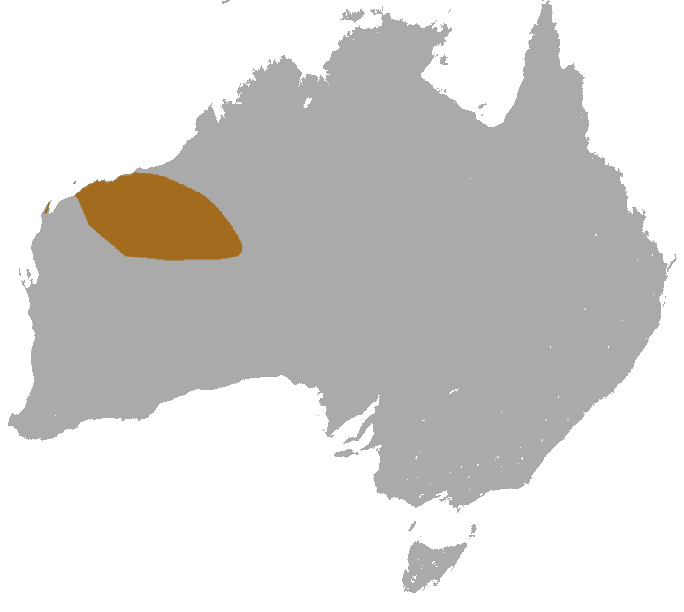
- Rory Cooper's false antechinus range

Species of marsupial

Rory Cooper's false antechinus (Pseudantechinus roryi), also known as the tan false antechinus and the tan pseudantechinus, is a recently named species of small carnivorous marsupial which inhabits rocky outcrops in Western Australia. Nothing is known of its behaviour but it is expected that this will be similar to other members of the false antechinus genus. A study published in 2017 found no support for separation as a new species of Pseudantechinus, and the name was proposed to be synonymous with the previously described Pseudantechinus macdonnellensis.

Rory Cooper's false antechinus has been found from the Pilbara into the Great Sandy and Gibson Deserts. It is possible that false antechinuses found on Barrow Island also belong to this species. It differs from other members of its genus in its reddish-brown colouring; the typical colouring of a false antechinus is grey-brown.

An analysis of specimens in a comparison of Pseudantechinus phylogenies, based on evidence of mitochondrial and nuclear genes, found no support for separation from the species Pseudantechinus macdonnellensis.
