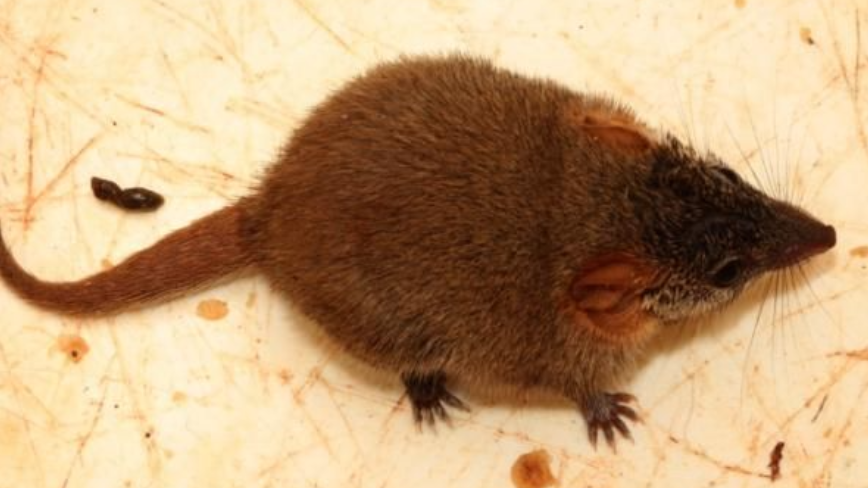

Conservation status
- Near Threatened (IUCN 3.1)

Scientific classification
- Kingdom: Animalia
- Phylum: Chordata
- Class: Mammalia
- Infraclass: Marsupialia
- Order: Dasyuromorphia
- Family: Dasyuridae
- Genus: Pseudantechinus
- Species: P. mimulus

Binomial name
- Pseudantechinus mimulus (Thomas 1906)
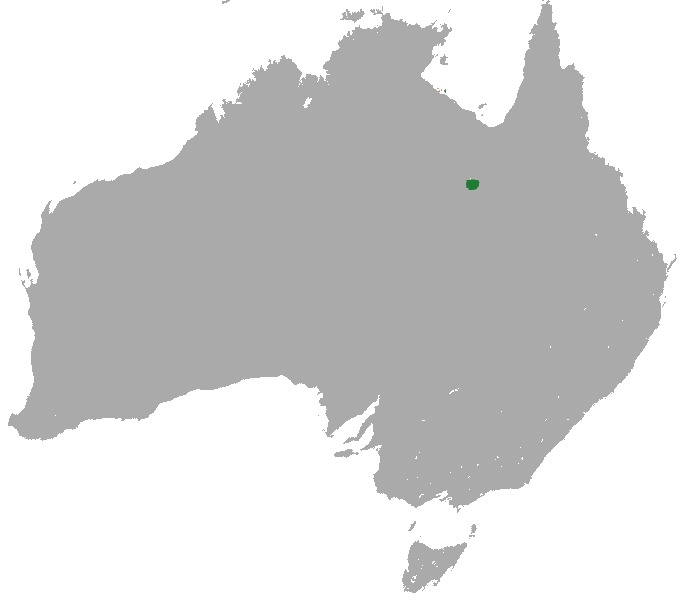
- Alexandria false antechinus range

= Alexandria false antechinus =

Species of marsupial

The Alexandria false antechinus (Pseudantechinus mimulus), also known as the Carpentarian false antechinus or Carpentarian pseudantechinus, is a small carnivorous marsupial, found only in a number of small, isolated localities in northern Australia. It is the smallest and rarest of the false antechinuses.

== Taxonomy ==
The Alexandria false antechinus has had a long history of confusion with the fat-tailed false antechinus (P. macdonnellensis) ever since it was first described by Oldfield Thomas in 1906. W.D.L. Ride suppressed the species in 1971, placing it with the fat-tailed false antechinus, but it was restored by D.J. Kitchener in 1991. Its scientific name means "little mimic of false-antechinus".

The P. mimulus is classified as an endangered species due to the decline in habitat quality and extent as a result of fire, introduced predators, and mining.

== Description ==
The Alexandria false antechinus is coloured buff brown above and greyish white below. Its main distinguishing feature from other false antechinuses is its small size. The behaviour of this species has not been described.

== Habitat ==
This species is endemic to Australia, found only in five localities: near Mount Isa in northwestern Queensland; Alexandria Station on the Barkly Tableland in the Northern Territory; and three small islands in the Sir Edward Pellew Group, in the north-east of the territory. In 2009 it was recorded from Pungalina-Seven Emu Sanctuary in the Northern Territory.

In the 1988 census of the territories the species was found in the Centre and South West Islands, but in the 2003 census it was not located. It is believed that the P. mimulus still resides within that area, but is yet to be confirmed. It inhabits stony hillsides with woodland and spinifex grass.

== Conservation status ==
The Alexandria false antechinus has a very limited distribution, which has resulted in its classification by the IUCN as endangered. On the offshore islands it inhabits, it is fairly common; however, it is rare and, in 1995, had not been seen on the mainland since 1905, when it was discovered.

== Diet ==
While a lot of details about the species diet is unknown, it is believed that they eat mostly invertebrates as well as some small vertebrates.
