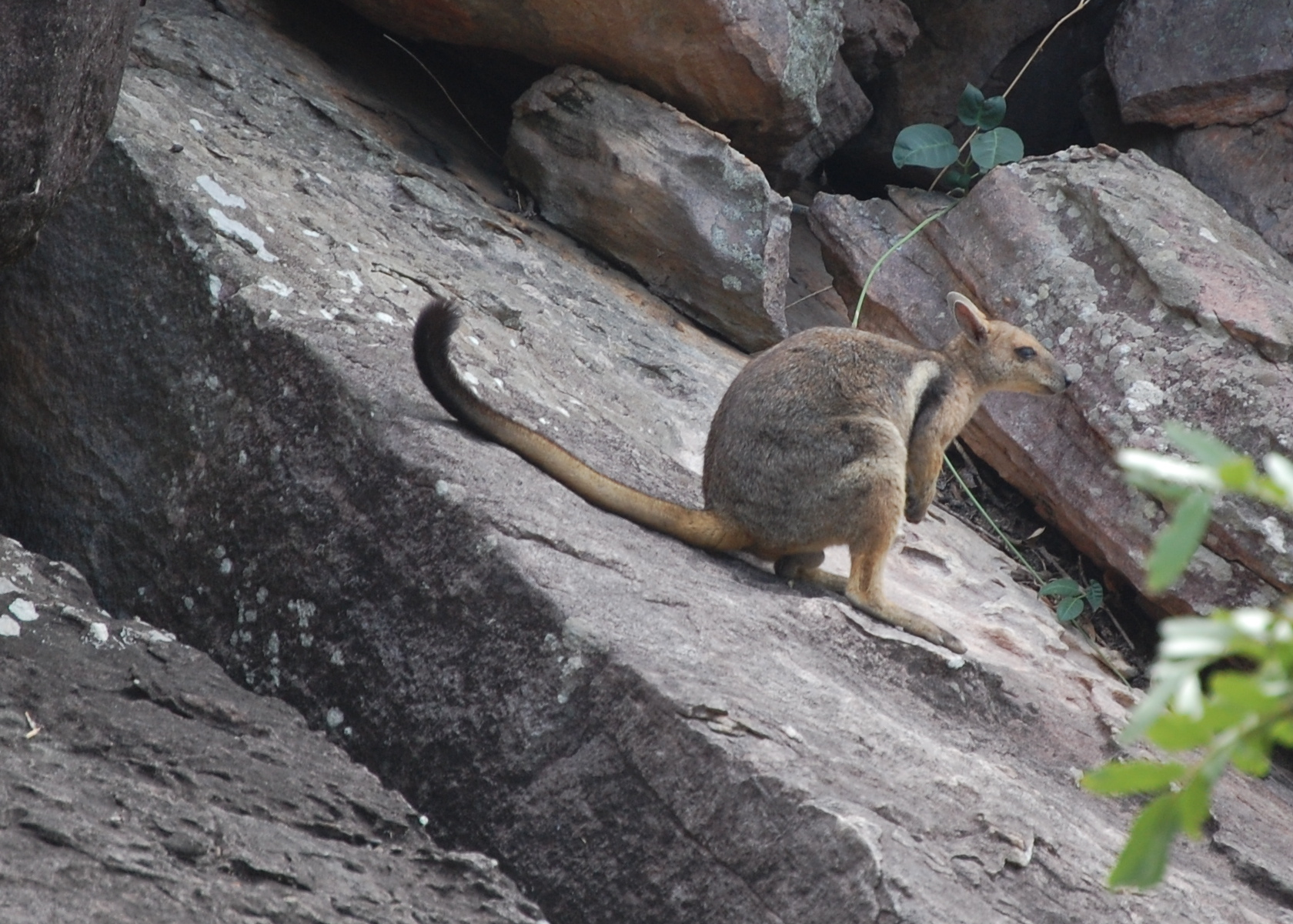
- Short-eared rock-wallaby in Kakadu National Park

Conservation status
- Least Concern (IUCN 3.1)

Scientific classification
- Kingdom: Animalia
- Phylum: Chordata
- Class: Mammalia
- Infraclass: Marsupialia
- Order: Diprotodontia
- Family: Macropodidae
- Genus: Petrogale
- Species: P. brachyotis

Binomial name
- Petrogale brachyotis (Gould, 1841)

Subspecies
- P. brachyotis brachyotis; P. brachyotis victoriae
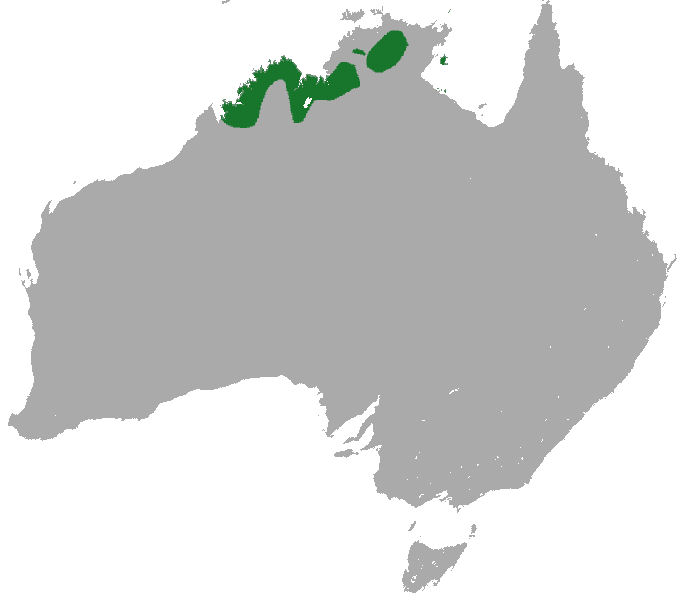
- Short-eared rock-wallaby range

= Short-eared rock-wallaby =

Species of marsupial

The short-eared rock-wallaby (Petrogale brachyotis) is a species of rock-wallaby found in northern Australia, in the northernmost parts of the Northern Territory and Western Australia. It is much larger than its three closest relatives, the eastern short-eared rock-wallaby (Petrogale wilkinsi), the nabarlek (Petrogale concinna) and the monjon (Petrogale burbidgei).

== Taxonomy ==
The species was described by John Gould in 1841.

In 2014 a genetic and morphological study identified a separate species, the eastern short-eared rock-wallaby (Petrogale wilkinsi), previously thought to be P. brachyotis. It occurs in the Kakadu and Litchfield National Parks, weighs less, and has stronger markings and colouring.

Prior to a revision of the genus in 2014, a number of subspecies had been recognised. A tentative arrangement of two subspecies were proposed in that revision, identifying a taxon that may be a third species as the subspecies Petrogale brachyotis victoriae.

== Description ==
A species of Petrogale, known as rock-wallabies, that varies in its size and coloration and has been recognised as a species group. Referred to as the brachyotis species group of the genus, they exist in an area that has made study difficult, although examination of specimens in 2014 separated one species and identified other cryptic taxa within the population.

Prior to its revision, the generalised description for the species Petrogale brachyotis (sensu lato) incorporated variations later recognised as distinctive characters. The grey-brown coloration of the fur is interspersed with silver hair that highlights the overall coloration. the underside is pale grey. The length of the head and body combined is from 415 to 550 millimetres (16.3 to 21.7 in), and they weigh 2.2 to 5.5 kilograms (4.9 to 12.1 lb). The tail is relatively short for the genus, 320 to 550 mm (13 to 22 in), a dark brown to blackish tuft of fur appears at the terminus and the colour is otherwise cinnamon brown. The ears are also relatively small, less than half the length of the head, measuring from 40 to 48 mm (1.6 to 1.9 in). The cinnamon colour also appears at the legs, broken by a buff or whitish stripe at the thigh that extends over the flank and over the shoulder, where a darker patch appears below the forelimb. A buff patch at the side of the snout has an off-white coloured stripe below that reaches to the eye. A dark stripe beginning at the crown of the head continues to the middle of the back. All the coloration is duller and the striping less distinct in populations found at the Victoria River and Kimberley region.

The nominate subspecies bases its description of a specimen collected at Hanover Bay.

There is a second subspecies, described by four specimens of a population that may be elevated to species rank after examination of more material. The holotype of Petrogale brachyotis victoriae was obtained in 1974 at Lobby Creek in the "Bradshaw" region of the Northern Territory. The population is only known from collections made near the Victoria River, inspiring the authors to propose that name as the taxon's epithet.

== Behaviour ==
The short-eared rock-wallaby is a gregarious vegetarian, found in rocky hills and gorges. It is variable in its appearance but is generally grey-brown with white areas around its face and legs. It is not considered threatened.

== Distribution and habitat ==
Petrogale brachyotis has a patchy occurrence within a wide distribution range, extending west from the border of Queensland and the Northern Territory through the Top End to the Windjana Gorge in northwestern Australia. The range inland is limited to areas of rainfall above the 600 mm isohyet. They are also found as island populations in the Gulf of Carpentaria. The favoured habitat is monsoonal rainforest and open grasslands, where they inhabit cliffs, hills and valleys that provide refuge and forage.

== In Aboriginal language and culture ==
Speakers of Kunwinjku in West Arnhem Land call the wallaby badbong, and people would traditionally travel with spears into the escarpment to hunt them. According to Kunwinjku elder Reverend Peterson Nganjmirra they would trap badbong in rocky country by setting fire to "spinifex" (actually Triodia spp.).

== Conservation ==
The IUCN Red List notes the conservation status of the species was assessed as least concern in 2015. The trajectory of the population is not known. Local extinctions are known to have occurred in the southern range in the Northern Territory, the subpopulation in Western Australia has not been historically surveyed. Altered fire regimes may detrimentally affect local populations of the species, and the IUCN advisory group recommends study of the effect of this and other factors on this poorly monitored species.
