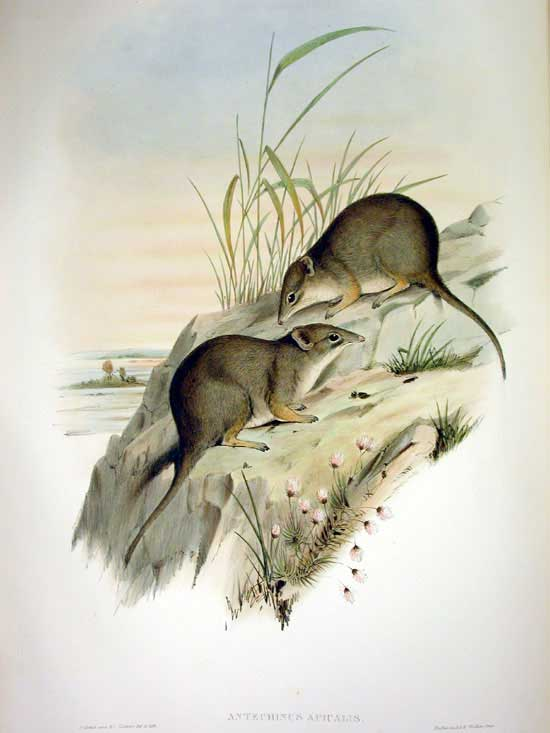

Conservation status
- Endangered (IUCN 3.1)

Scientific classification
- Kingdom: Animalia
- Phylum: Chordata
- Class: Mammalia
- Infraclass: Marsupialia
- Order: Dasyuromorphia
- Family: Dasyuridae
- Subfamily: Dasyurinae
- Tribe: Dasyurini
- Genus: Parantechinus; Tate, 1947
- Species: P. apicalis

Binomial name
- Parantechinus apicalis (J.E. Gray, 1842)
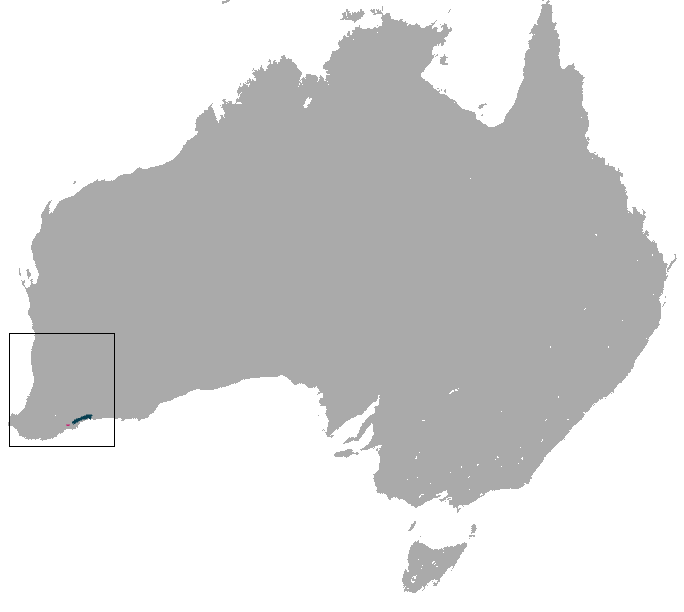
- Dibbler range (blue — native, pink — reintroduced)

= Dibbler =

Species of marsupial

The dibbler (Parantechinus apicalis) is an endangered species of marsupial. It is an inhabitant of the southwest mainland of Western Australia and some offshore islands. It is a member of the order Dasyuromorphia, and the only member of the genus Parantechinus. The dibbler is a small, nocturnal carnivore with speckled fur that is white around the eyes.

== Description ==
The dibbler is 10–16 cm (3.9–6.3 in) long with a 7.5–12 cm (3.0–4.7 in) tail; it weighs 40–125 g (1.4–4.4 oz). Distinctive features include a white eye-ring, gray-brown fur flecked with white hairs, and a short tapering tail. It has strong jaws and large canine teeth for killing prey, which include small vertebrates such as mice, birds and lizards, as well as insects and other invertebrates. They are semi-arboreal and will also feed on nectar from flowering plants and berries. Dibblers weigh about 40–135 grams (1.4–3.6 oz).The breeding season for the species is March–April, with the female able to give birth and raise up to eight young. The dibbler is a solitary, mostly crepuscular species.

The dibbler is found in southwestern Western Australia, where it is located on Boullanger Island, Whitlock Island, and Escape Island, (translocated) off Jurien Bay. They are also found on the south coast in the Fitzgerald River National Park, Peniup Proposed Nature Reserve (where it was re-introduced) and on Gunton Island in the Recherche Archipelago (where it was also re-introduced). They have also recently been released on Dirk Hartog Island as part of the Return to 1616 project run by the Department of Biodiversity, Conservation and Attractions. There were attempted releases at the Stirling Range National Park and Waychinicup National Park but it is not thought that they still persist in those locations. A specimen was also captured in Torndirrup National Park south of Albany.

The dibbler resides in unburnt vegetation areas with thick litter layers and sandy soils, typically occupying coastal mallee-heath vegetation communities on the south coast.

== Taxonomy ==
=== Classification ===
The dibbler is the only member of its genus, Parantechinus, the name indicating that it is "antechinus-like". The specific epithet, apicalis, means "pointed". This genus formerly included the sandstone false antechinus, which is now placed in the genus Pseudantechinus.

The genus Parantechinus contains only the single species, Parantechinus apicalis, the dibbler. It was first described in 1842 by John Edward Gray, who placed it in the genus Phascogale. He identified the specimen as being Australasian in origin. The genus Parantechinus was created for the species in 1947 by George Henry Hamilton Tate. The species was also assigned to the genus Antechinus, before being split to its own genus. There are various arrangements of the genera in this section of family Dasyuridae, many of which are supported by molecular systematics, and their relationship remains unresolved.

=== Common name ===
The name 'dibbler' is used by government and scientific authorities, and in popular usage, to refer to this species exclusively. In the Dibbler Recovery Plan, Senior DBCA scientist, Dr. Tony Friend notes:

Strahan (2003) introduced the common name "southern dibbler" for P. apicalis [Parantechinus apicalis] and "northern dibbler" for the sandstone antechinus" [Pseudantechinus bilarni] ... the well-established use of "dibbler" to refer only to P. apicalis is recommended and is followed in this plan."

A number of common names derive from previous systematic arrangements. John Gould gave several names from the Noongar language; Marn-dern and Wy-a-lung are from northern areas, Dib-bler is from the dialect spoken in the King George Sound region. The practice of restoring traditional names to marsupial species has conserved this common name. Gould referred to the species as the freckled antechinus.

The online edition of Mammal Species of the World gave the name Southern dibbler in 2009.

== Conservation status ==
In the early 19th century, dibblers were widely distributed across Western Australia. By 1884, they were declared extinct, but some were rediscovered at Cheyne Beach on the southern coast of Western Australia in 1967. They are threatened by habitat loss (land clearing, dieback) and predators; they are considered an endangered species. Their predators are mainly foxes and feral cats.

Perth Zoo in Western Australia operates a conservation project for the dibbler which is helpful in its survival and breeding; along with the Department of Environment and Conservation, this project has helped to breed and release more dibblers into the wild.
