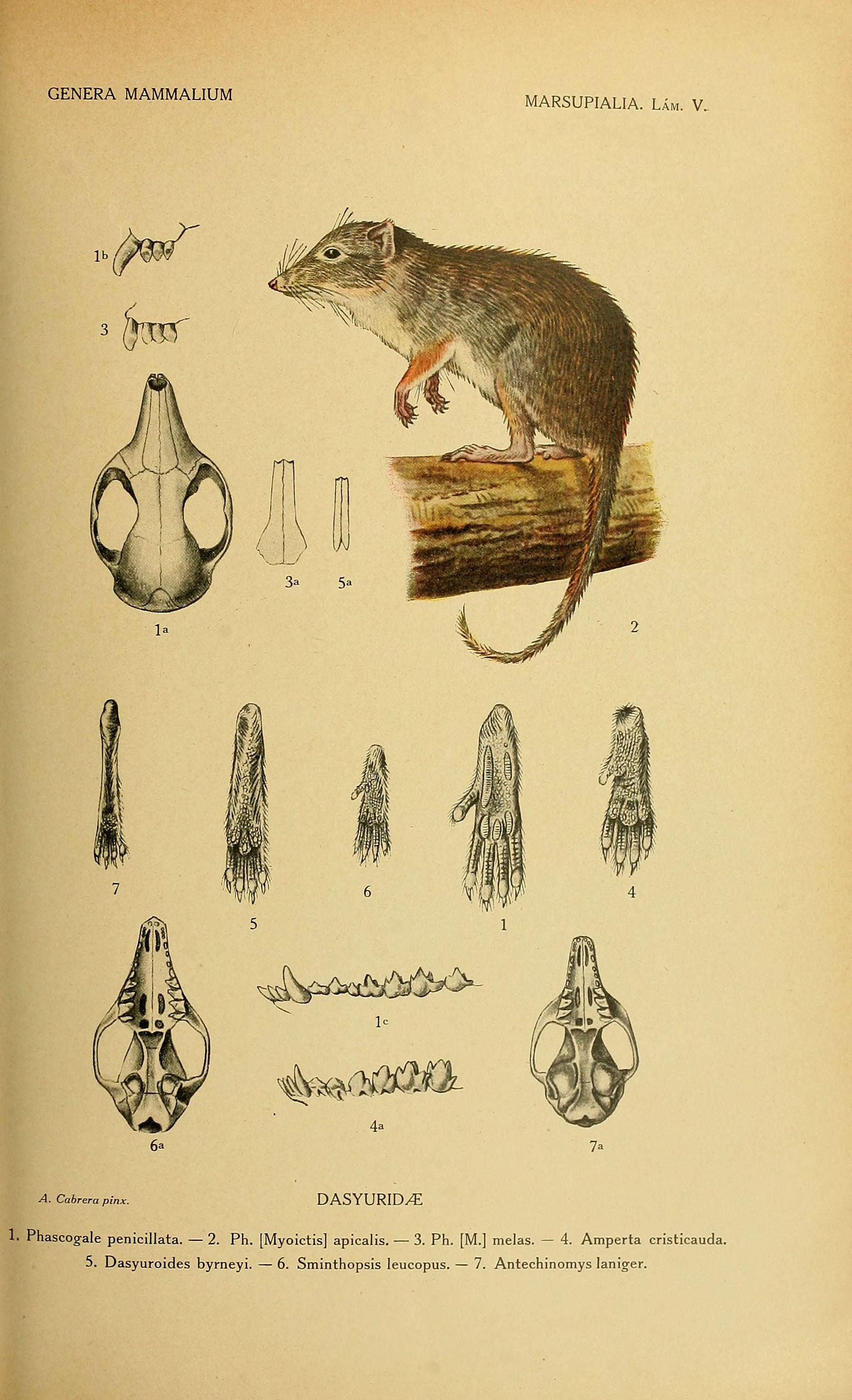

Scientific classification
- Kingdom: Animalia
- Phylum: Chordata
- Class: Mammalia
- Infraclass: Marsupialia
- Order: Dasyuromorphia
- Family: Dasyuridae
- Tribe: Sminthopsini
- Genus: Antechinomys; Krefft, 1867

Type species
- Phascogale lanigera Gould, 1856

= Antechinomys =

Antechinomys Temporal range: Quaternary - Recent

Genus of marsupials

Antechinomys is a genus of the family Dasyuridae, and is represented by two living species. It is the sister genus of Sminthopsis.

== Taxonomy ==
As of 2026 there are four species assigned to this genus:

- Antechinomys auritus Dodd, Catullo, Travouillon, A. M. Baker, Westerman, & Umbrello, 2025
- Antechinomys laniger (J. Gould, 1856)
- Antechinomys longicaudatus (W. B. Spencer, 1909)
- Antechinomys spenceri O. Thomas, 1906
