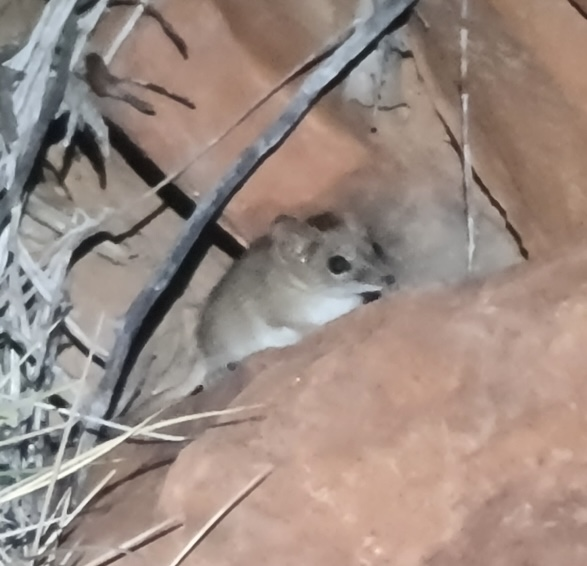

Conservation status
- Least Concern (IUCN 3.1)

Scientific classification
- Kingdom: Animalia
- Phylum: Chordata
- Class: Mammalia
- Infraclass: Marsupialia
- Order: Dasyuromorphia
- Family: Dasyuridae
- Genus: Pseudantechinus
- Species: P. macdonnellensis

Binomial name
- Pseudantechinus macdonnellensis (Spencer, 1896)
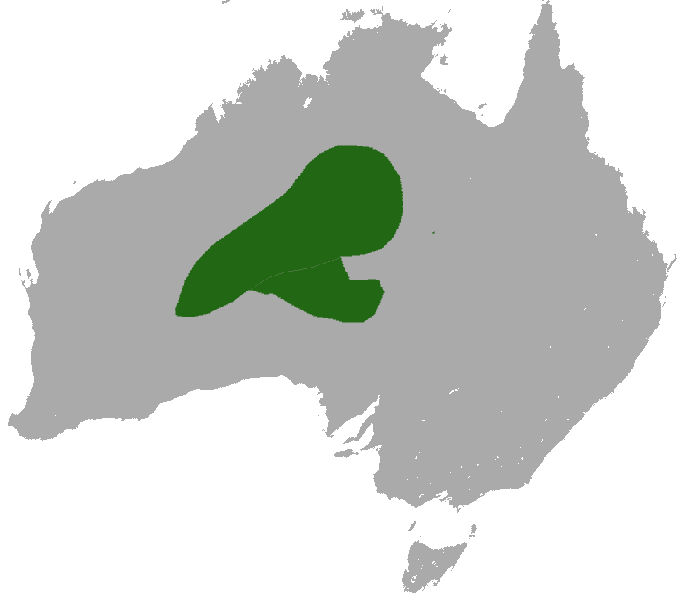
- Fat-tailed false antechinus range

= Fat-tailed false antechinus =

Species of marsupial

The fat-tailed false antechinus (Pseudantechinus macdonnellensis), also called the fat-tailed pseudantechinus and red-eared antechinus, is a member of the order Dasyuromorphia. It is an inhabitant of western and central Australia. Its species name, macdonnellensis, refers to the MacDonnell Ranges near Alice Springs, where it was first discovered.

== Taxonomy ==
Scientific name: Pseudantechinus macdonellensis. Common name: Fat-tailed-antechinus, fat-tailed pseudantechinus.

It was first described in 1896 by Sir Walter Baldwin Spencer, who placed it in the genus Phascogale. It was for a long time included in the genus Antechinus. The species has formerly included the Alexandria false antechinus (P. mimulus), the Ningbing false antechinus (P. ningbing), and Woolley's false antechinus (P. woolleyae).

The P. macdonellensis is commonly found in the rocky environments of Central Australia. It is presumed to have a large population, and generally lives within the confines of protected areas. Therefore, it is unlikely to decline at the rate needed to be listed as an endangered species.

== Description ==
The fat-tailed false antechinus is a medium-sized dasyurid marsupial that ranges from 18–33 g (0.63–1.16 oz), and has a life span of about seven years.is 9.5-10.5 cm long with a 7.5-8.5 cm tail; it weighs 20-45g. It has a carrot-shaped tail swollen with fat which serves as a food reserve. Its fur is grey-brown. It has litters of up to six young, born in July–September (slightly later further west in the range). It is an insectivorous and nocturnal species.

== Habitat ==
The P. macdonellensis is commonly found in the rocky environments of Central Australia. In addition it is found throughout South Australia, the Northern Territory and Western Australia. An outlying population in more coastal areas of Western Australia has been reclassified as a new species, Rory Cooper's false antechinus (P. roryi). The species inhabits rocky slopes and plains.

== Diet ==
The P. macdonellensis is generally an insectivore whose diet consists of beetles, grasshoppers, and termites. A characteristic specific to this kind of species is its ability to store fat in its tail when food is plentiful.

== Torpor ==
In the winter most free ranging P. macdonellensis go into a state of torpor after midnight within the confines of rock crevices, and stay there until day breaks. In the morning, while they are still torpid, they move from the rock-crevices to basking sites exposed to the sun. Subsequently, this type of basking continues for the rest of the day. It appears that daily torpor is done in order to reduce the amount of daily expenditure by about 30%, and allows the species to live and reproduce in a challenging environment. It has also been observed that the species goes into a state of torpor in circumstances in which the species finds itself under acute energetic stress.

== Gestation ==
Males and females of the subdivision P. macdonellensis reach sexual maturity at about 350 days of age. A single gestation period takes about 43 days in the females, and produces a single litter of about six. The interval in between gestation periods is about 365 days.
