= Ningbing false antechinus =

Conservation status
- Least Concern (IUCN 3.1)

Scientific classification
- Kingdom: Animalia
- Phylum: Chordata
- Class: Mammalia
- Infraclass: Marsupialia
- Order: Dasyuromorphia
- Family: Dasyuridae
- Genus: Pseudantechinus
- Species: P. ningbing

Binomial name
- Pseudantechinus ningbing Kitchener 1988
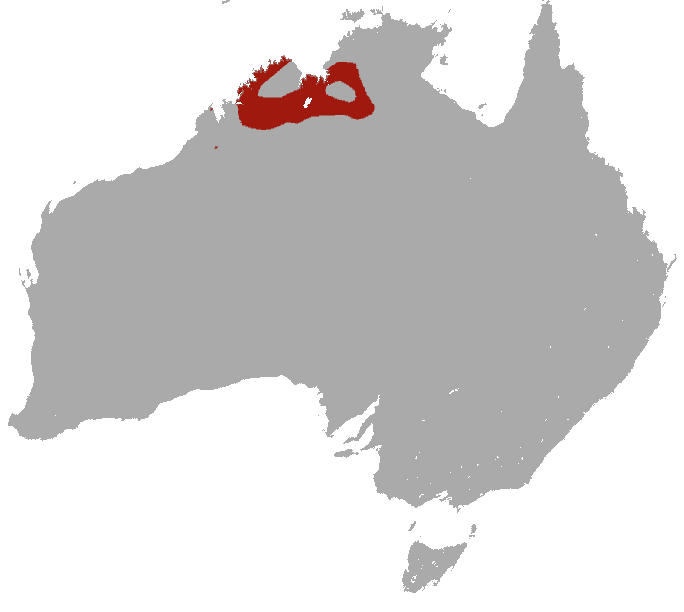
- Ningbing false antechinus range

Species of marsupial

The Ningbing false antechinus (Pseudantechinus ningbing), also known as the Ningbing pseudantechinus, is a small species of carnivorous marsupial found in north-western Australia. It is locally common throughout the Kimberley region of Western Australia and the Northern Territory.

== Taxonomy ==
The Ningbing false antechinus was first collected by Harry Butler at Ningbing, an abandoned station in the Kimberley region. It was long considered to be a form of the fat-tailed false antechinus (P. macdonnellensis), but was given distinct species status by D. J. Kitchener in 1988. Its common and species names honour the location of its discovery.

The Ningbing false antechinus is a dasyurid marsupial and is closely related to other false antechinuses, particularly the fat-tailed false antechinus.

== Description ==
The Ningbing false antechinus is similar to the fat-tailed false antechinus (Pseudantechinus macdonnellensis) but the females have four and not six teats. It also has a longer tail, with long hairs at the base and the remainder slightly scaly in appearance.

The behaviour of this species is little known. It mates in June and has a comparatively long gestation of 45–52 days. Young are born in July–August and are weaned by October–November.

== Habitat ==
The Ningbing false antechinus is found in the Kimberley region of Western Australia, inhabiting rocky outcrops in a wide range of vegetation types.
