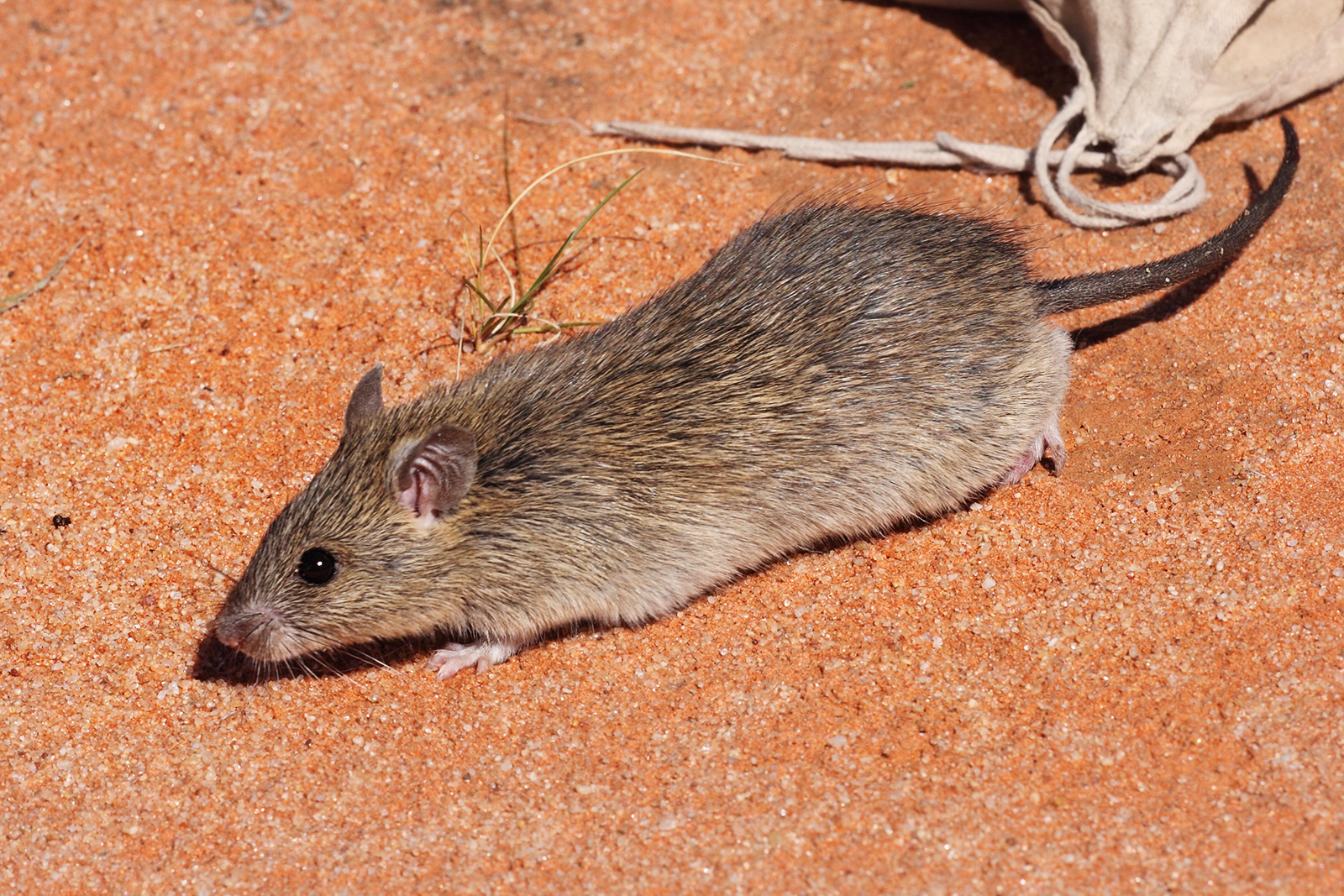

Conservation status
- Least Concern (IUCN 3.1)

Scientific classification
- Kingdom: Animalia
- Phylum: Chordata
- Class: Mammalia
- Infraclass: Placentalia
- Order: Rodentia
- Family: Muridae
- Genus: Rattus
- Species: R. villosissimus

Binomial name
- Rattus villosissimus Waite, 1898

= Long-haired rat =

Species of mammal

The long-haired rat (Rattus villosissimus), is a species of rodent in the family Muridae which is native to Australia. The long-haired rat is well known for its population irruptions over vast areas of Australia which is the basis of its alternative common name, the plague rat. Most of the research on the long-haired rat has been conducted during times of massive population fluctuations and therefore little is known about their biology in a non-eruptive period.

== Characteristics ==
The long-haired rat can be distinguished by its very long, coarse guard hairs that form an outer layer to protect the softer underfur. The species is generally a light grey colour with the black guard hairs giving and overall greyish speckled appearance. This distinguishes them from the tan or brown colouration of many other rat species. A male long-haired rat can grow to an average size of 187 mm with a tail length of approximately 150 mm while a female can grow to an average of 167 mm with an approximate tail length of 141 mm. The average weight for males is 156 g and for females is 112 g.

== Habitat ==
Long-haired rats typically occur in temperate, sub-tropical, desert and hummock grasslands regions. However, during a plague eruption, they can be found in virtually every habitat including farm outbuildings and homesteads as well as invading cultivated pastures such as sorghum and oats. However, when population numbers are low, they are restricted to a much smaller range closer to sources of food and water.

Long-haired rats rely on dense vegetation or burrows for shelter. Their burrows can range in complexity from a simple shallow passage to a structure with 20 meters of complex tunnels which lead to multiple chambers.

== Distribution ==
The distribution of the long-haired rat can vary depending on whether or not the population is experiencing an eruption. After a period of rain when water and food resources are widely available, the long-haired rat has been recorded to have a distribution of up to 130,000 square kilometers across New South Wales, Queensland, Western Australia and the majority of the Northern Territory and South Australia. During its eruptive periods, population numbers can reach hundreds of individuals per hectare.

Less information is known about the distribution of the long-haired rat in a non-eruptive period however it is known that they can spend only 13 days without green vegetation and water therefore their distribution is thought to be much more restricted and centered on water and food sources. See external link for distribution map.

== Behaviour ==
Long-haired rats are nocturnal and their activities seem to be influenced by the amount of moonlight. They are a very terrestrial species with the majority of an individual's activity being spent in and around their burrow and up to 80% of time being spent below ground. They move across open areas but constantly remain closer to vegetation cover to protect themselves against predation.

== Breeding ==
The long-haired rat is able to breed at any time of the year as long as food resources are available. The litter sizes vary from 5-10 however during a plague epidemic they are capable of reproducing at a rate of 12 young every three weeks. The gestation period ranges from 22 to 24 days and young rats generally reach sexual maturity at 70 days old.

== Diet ==
The diet of the long-haired rat is not fully understood. It is thought that their diet is composed mostly of stems, leaves and roots of grasses, herbs and succulent plants as well as some seeds and insects. In agricultural areas they feed on a variety of crops such as rockmelons and sunflowers. While they are largely herbivorous, the long-haired rat is thought, at times, to be carnivorous and even cannibalistic.

== Predation ==
The long-haired rat is subject to a high level of predation from a number of predators. These include birds of prey such as the barn owl (Tyto alba) and the letter-winged kite (Elanus scriptus), kowari, dingo, feral cats, foxes and inland taipans.

== Status ==
The long-haired rat is not listed under the Environment Protection and Biodiversity Conservation (EPBC) Act 1999. It is however listed as a pest of agriculture under the Agriculture and Related Resources Protection Act 1976 by the Western Australian Department of Resources and Food. This allows the implementation of approved management programs in various areas of Western Australia. However the protection of the Wildlife Conservation Act 1950 administered by the Department of Environment and Conservation (DEC) means that the rats can only be destroyed after obtaining a license from the DEC. The management programs include options such as management of uncropped areas, encouraging birds of prey and/or poisoning.
