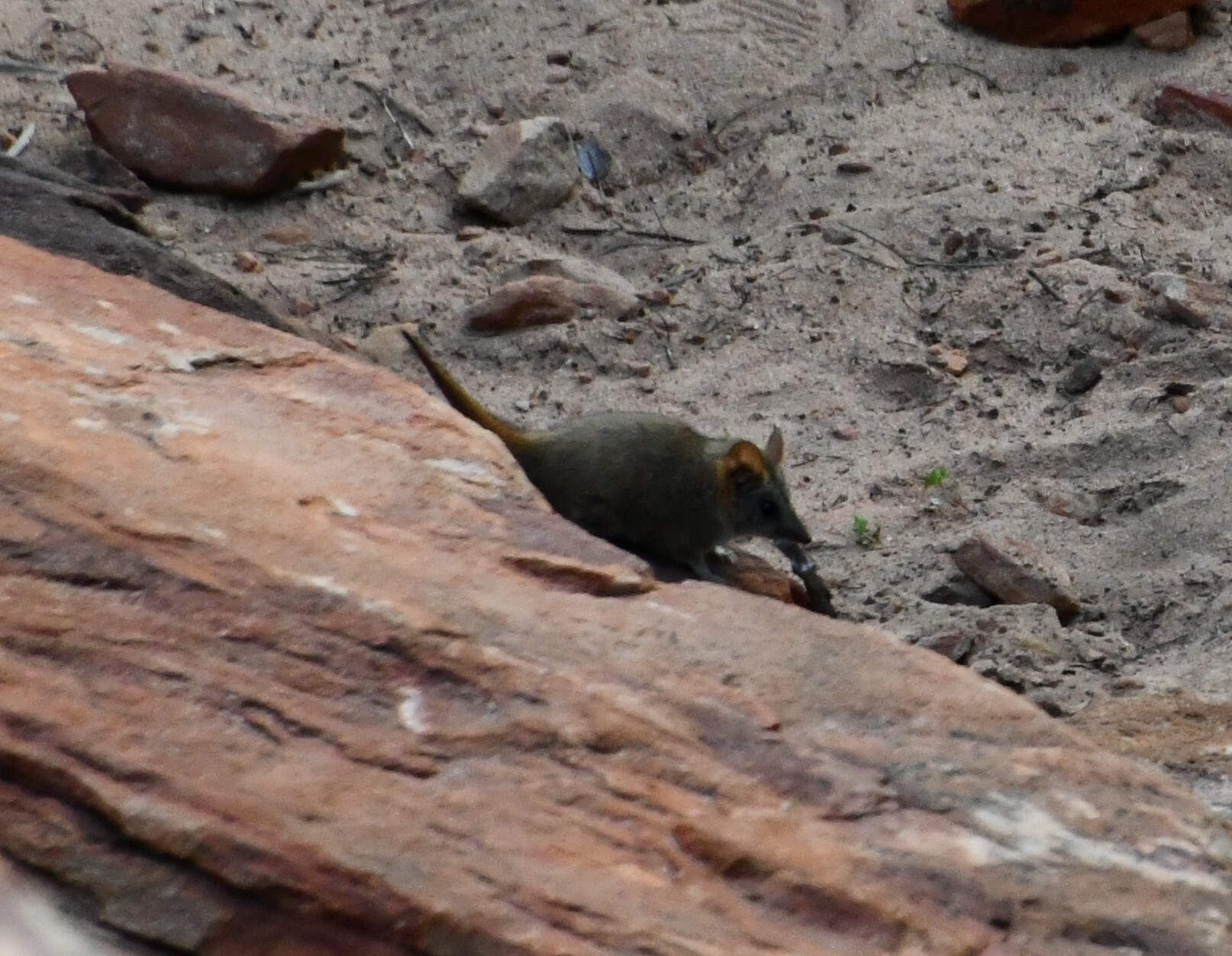

Scientific classification
- Domain: Eukaryota
- Kingdom: Animalia
- Phylum: Chordata
- Class: Mammalia
- Infraclass: Marsupialia
- Order: Dasyuromorphia
- Family: Dasyuridae
- Subfamily: Dasyurinae
- Tribe: Dasyurini
- Genus: Pseudantechinus; Tate, 1947

Type species
- Phascogale macdonnellensis Spencer, 1896

Species
- P. bilarni; P. macdonnellensis; P. mimulus; P. ningbing; P. roryi; P. woolleyae

= False antechinus =

False antechinuses

Genus of marsupials

The genus Pseudantechinus are members of the order Dasyuromorphia. They are often called false antechinuses, although this genus includes the sandstone dibbler, which was previously assigned to a different genus.

The species of this genus are as follows:

- Sandstone dibbler, Pseudantechinus bilarni
- Fat-tailed false antechinus, Pseudantechinus macdonnellensis
- Alexandria false antechinus, Pseudantechinus mimulus
- Ningbing false antechinus, Pseudantechinus ningbing
- Rory Cooper's false antechinus, Pseudantechinus roryi
- Woolley's false antechinus, Pseudantechinus woolleyae
