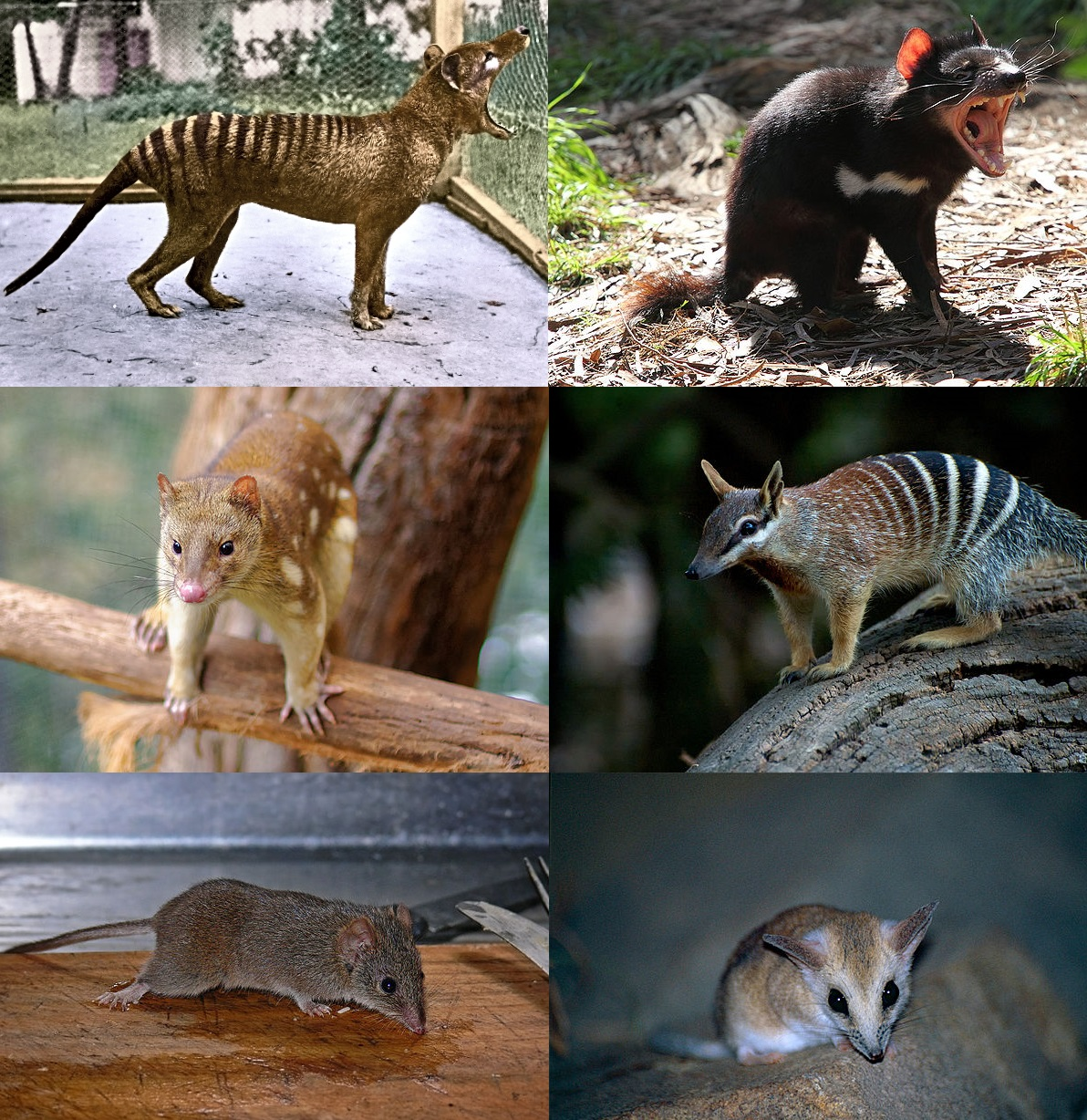
- Clockwise from top left: thylacine, Tasmanian devil, numbat, fat-tailed dunnart, yellow-footed antechinus and tiger quoll

Scientific classification
- Kingdom: Animalia
- Phylum: Chordata
- Class: Mammalia
- Infraclass: Marsupialia
- Clade: Agreodontia
- Order: Dasyuromorphia; Gill, 1872

Families
- Dasyuridae; Myrmecobiidae; †Malleodectidae; †Thylacinidae

= Dasyuromorphia =

Dasyuromorphia Temporal range: Late Oligocene–Present

Taxon of carnivorous marsupials

Dasyuromorphia (/dæsijʊəroʊˈmɔːrfiə/ da-see-yoor-oh-MOR-fee-ə) is an order comprising most of the Australian carnivorous marsupials. The order contains four families: Myrmecobiidae, with just a single living species, the numbat (Myrmecobius fasciatus); Thylacinidae, with one recently extinct species, the thylacine (Thylacinus cynocephalus) and several fossil species; Dasyuridae, with 73 extant species, including quolls, dunnarts, and the Tasmanian devil; and the extinct fossil family Malleodectidae with six genera.

== Description ==
The body size of dasyuromorphs varies considerably, from only 4 grams (0.14 oz) in long-tailed planigale, which is the smallest living marsupial, up to 35 kilograms (77 lb) in the recently extinct thylacine (Thylacinus cynocephalus). They show considerable morphological diversity, including the kultarr (Antechinomys laniger), which is adapted for hopping locomotion. Members of the group are mostly carnivorous, either feeding on vertebrate prey or arthropods such as insects. The lower molar teeth of dasyuromorphs typically show a carnassial-like morphology. Members of this order are monophyodont, meaning they only have one set of teeth throughout their lives. Each erupting molar must function as a carnassial, before being pushed forward in the jaw by the next erupting molar. Because of this, dasyuromorphs are prevented from adapting some molars for other functions, which may have restricted their diversity relative to carnivorans.

== Phylogeny ==
Overall phylogeny of Dasyuromorphia (greatly truncated) after Kealy et al. 2017:

- Dasyuromorphia
  - Thylacinidae
    †Thylacinus (thylacine)
  - - Myrmecobiidae
      Myrmecobius (numbat)
    - Dasyuridae
      - Sminthopsis (dunnarts)
      - - Phascogale (wambengers)
        - - Sarcophilus (Tasmanian devil)
          - Dasyurus (quolls)

Upham et al. 2019

- - Myrmecobiidae
    Myrmecobius (Numbats)
  - Dasyuridae (20 genera, 72 species)
    - Sminthopsinae
      - Planigale (planigales)
      - - Ningaui (ningauis)
        - Sminthopsis [Antechinomys] (dunnarts, kultarrs)
    - Dasyurinae
      - Phascogalini
        - Phascogale (phascogales)
        - - Murexia
          - Antechinus (antechinuses)
      - Dasyurini
        - Pseudantechinus (False antechinus)
        - - - - - Dasyuroides (kowari)
                - Dasykaluta (little red kaluta)
              - Dasycercus (mulgara)
            - - Parantechinus (dibblers)
              - - Pseudantechinus ningbing
                - Myoictis (Three-striped dasyure)
          - - - Neophascogale (speckled dasyure)
              - Phascolosorex (marsupial shrews)
            - Dasyurus [Sarcophilus] (quolls)

Álvarez-Carretero et al. 2022

- - Myrmecobiidae
    Myrmecobius
  - Dasyuridae
    - Sminthopsinae
      - Planigale
      - - Sminthopsis species-group 1
        - - Sminthopsis species-group 2
          - - Sminthopsis species-group 3 [Antechinomys]
            - Ningaui
    - Dasyurinae
      - Phascogalini
        - Antechinus
        - - Phascogale
          - Murexia
      - Dasyurini
        - - - Neophascogale
            - Phascolosorex
          - Dasyurus [Sarcophilus]
        - - Pseudantechinus
          - - - Dasycercus
              - Dasyuroides
            - - Dasykaluta
              - - Parantechinus
                - Myoictis

== See also ==
- List of mammal genera
- List of recently extinct mammals
- List of prehistoric mammals
