= List of dasyuromorphs =

Mammalian order of carnivorous marsupials

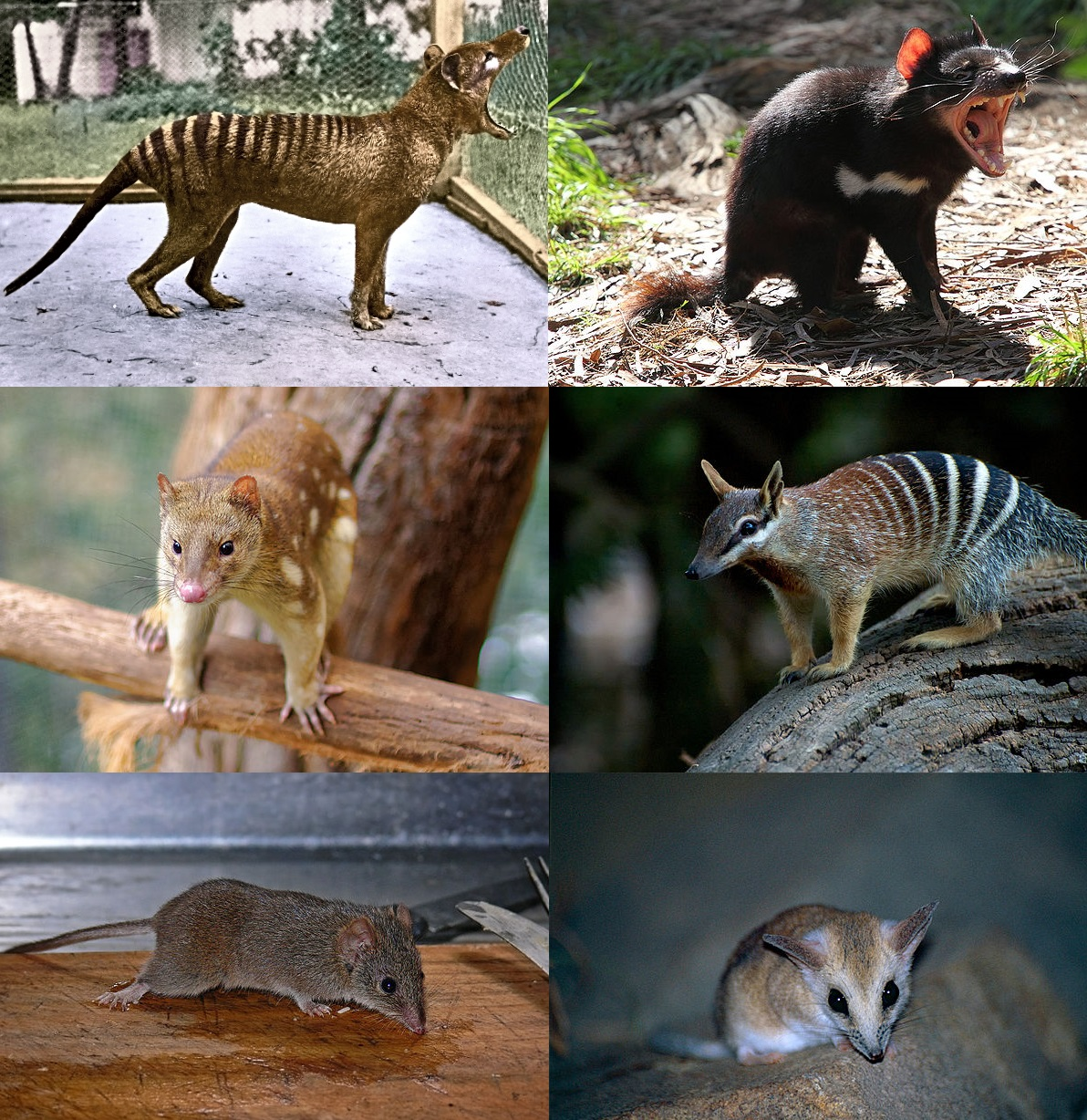
Species in Dasyuromorphia; clockwise from top left: thylacine, Tasmanian devil, numbat, fat-tailed dunnart, yellow-footed antechinus and tiger quoll

Dasyuromorphia is an order of mammals comprising most of the Australian carnivorous marsupials. Members of this order are called dasyuromorphs, and include quolls, dunnarts, the numbat, the Tasmanian devil, and the extinct thylacine. They are found in Australia and New Guinea, generally in forests, shrublands, and grasslands, but also inland wetlands, deserts, and rocky areas. They range in size from the southern ningaui, at 4 cm (2 in) plus a 4 cm (2 in) tail, to the Tasmanian devil, at 80 cm (31 in) plus a 30 cm (12 in) tail, though the thylacine was much larger at up to 195 cm (77 in) plus a 66 cm (26 in) tail. Dasyuromorphs primarily eat invertebrates, particularly insects and arthropods, though most will also eat small lizards or other vertebrates. As the two largest species in the order, Tasmanian devils instead eat carrion of larger mammals in addition to insects, and the thylacine ate larger mammals and livestock. Most dasyuromorphs do not have population estimates, but the ones that do range from 700 to 100,000. The eastern quoll, northern quoll, dibbler, and Tasmanian devil are categorized as endangered species, while the thylacine was made extinct in 1936 and the crest-tailed mulgara in 2026.

The seventy-one extant species of Dasyuromorphia are divided into two families: Dasyuridae, containing seventy species divided between the thirteen genera in the subfamily Dasyurinae and the four genera of the subfamily Sminthopsinae; and Myrmecobiidae, containing the numbat. There is additionally the family Thylacinidae, containing the extinct thylacine. Dozens of extinct Dasyuromorphia species have been discovered, though due to ongoing research and discoveries the exact number and categorization is not fixed.

== Conventions ==
IUCN Red List categories
Conservation status
- EX: Extinct (2 species)
- EW: Extinct in the wild (0 species)
- CR: Critically endangered (0 species)
- EN: Endangered (4 species)
- VU: Vulnerable (5 species)
- NT: Near threatened (12 species)
- LC: Least concern (47 species)

Other categories
- DD: Data deficient (3 species)
- NE: Not evaluated (0 species)

The author citation for the species or genus is given after the scientific name; parentheses around the author citation indicate that this was not the original taxonomic placement. Conservation status codes listed follow the International Union for Conservation of Nature (IUCN) Red List of Threatened Species. Range maps are provided wherever possible; if a range map is not available, a description of the dasyuromorph's range is provided. Ranges are based on the IUCN Red List for that species unless otherwise noted. All extinct species or subspecies listed alongside extant species went extinct after 1500 CE, and are indicated by a dagger symbol "†".

== Classification ==
The order Dasyuromorphia consists of two extant families, Dasyuridae and Myrmecobiidae. Dasyuridae is divided into two subfamilies: Dasyurinae, containing forty-two species in thirteen genera, and Sminthopsinae, containing twenty-seven species in four genera. Myrmecobiidae consists of a single species. Additionally, Dasyuromorphia contains the family Thylacinidae, whose only living member, the thylacine, was made extinct in 1936, and the crest-tailed mulgara in Dasyurinae was declared extinct in 2026. Many of these species are further subdivided into subspecies. This does not include hybrid species or extinct prehistoric species.

Family Dasyuridae

- Subfamily Dasyurinae
  - Tribe Dasyurini
    - Genus Dasycercus (mulgaras): two species (one extinct)
    - Genus Dasykaluta (little red kaluta): one species
    - Genus Dasyuroides (kowari): one species
    - Genus Dasyurus (quolls): six species
    - Genus Myoictis (three-striped dasyures): four species
    - Genus Neophascogale (speckled dasyures): one species
    - Genus Parantechinus (dibbler): one species
    - Genus Phascolosorex (marsupial shrews): two species
    - Genus Pseudantechinus (false antechinus): six species
    - Genus Sarcophilus (Tasmanian devil): one species
  - Tribe Phascogalini
    - Genus Antechinus (antechinuses): ten species
    - Genus Murexia (dasyures): five species
    - Genus Phascogale (phascogales): three species
- Subfamily Sminthopsinae
  - Tribe Planigalini
    - Genus Planigale (planigale): five species
  - Tribe Sminthopsini
    - Genus Antechinomys (kultarr): one species
    - Genus Ningaui (ningaui): three species
    - Genus Sminthopsis (dunnart): eighteen species

Family Myrmecobiidae

- Genus Myrmecobius (numbat): one species

Family Thylacinidae

- Genus Thylacinus† (thylacine): one species (one extinct)

- Dasyuromorphia
  - - - Dasyurinae
        - Dasyurini
          - - - Dasykaluta
              - - - Dasycercus
                  - Dasyuroides
                - - Myoictis
                  - Parantechinus
            - - - Dasyurus
                - Sarcophilus
              - - Neophascogale
                - Phascolosorex
          - Pseudantechinus
        - Phascogalini
          - Antechinus
          - - Murexia
            - Phascogale
      - Sminthopsinae
        - Sminthopsini
          - Antechinomys
          - Ningaui
          - Sminthopsis
        - Planigalini
          Planigale
    - - Myrmecobiidae
        Myrmecobius
  - - Thylacinidae
      Thylacinus†

== Dasyuromorphs ==
The following classification is based on the taxonomy described by the reference work Mammal Species of the World (2005), with augmentation by generally accepted proposals made since using molecular phylogenetic analysis, as supported by both the IUCN and the American Society of Mammalogists.

=== Dasyuridae ===
==== Subfamily Dasyurinae ====
Genus Antechinus – Macleay, 1841 – ten species
Common name	Scientific name and subspecies	Range	Size and ecology	IUCN status and estimated population
Agile antechinus	A. agilis Dickman, Parnaby, Crowther & King, 1998	Southern Australia	Size: 6–13 cm (2–5 in) long, plus 6–12 cm (2–5 in) tail Habitat: Forest and shrubland Diet: Arthropods and other invertebrates, as well as small vertebrates	LC Unknown
Atherton antechinus	A. godmani (Thomas, 1923)	Northeastern Australia	Size: 9–16 cm (4–6 in) long, plus 9–14 cm (4–6 in) tail Habitat: Forest Diet: Invertebrates, as well as small vertebrates and carrion	LC Unknown
Brown antechinus	A. stuartii Macleay, 1841	Eastern Australia	Size: 6–19 cm (2–7 in) long, plus 6–16 cm (2–6 in) tail Habitat: Forest Diet: Invertebrates such as beetles, spiders, and cockroaches, as well as vertebrates such as placental mice and plants	LC Unknown
Cinnamon antechinus	A. leo Dyck, 1980	Northeastern Australia	Size: 6–19 cm (2–7 in) long, plus 6–16 cm (2–6 in) tail Habitat: Forest Diet: Invertebrates, as well as small vertebrates	LC Unknown
Dusky antechinus	A. swainsonii (Waterhouse, 1840)	Southeastern Australia	Size: 8–19 cm (3–7 in) long, plus 7–13 cm (3–5 in) tail Habitat: Forest and shrubland Diet: Worms and insects as well as lizards, small birds, fruit, and plants	LC Unknown
Fawn antechinus	A. bellus (Thomas, 1904)	Northern Australia	Size: 6–19 cm (2–7 in) long, plus 6–16 cm (2–6 in) tail Habitat: Forest and savanna Diet: Invertebrates, as well as small vertebrates	VU 10,000–100,000
Subtropical antechinus	A. subtropicus Dyck, Crowther, 2000	Eastern Australia	Size: 6–19 cm (2–7 in) long, plus 6–16 cm (2–6 in) tail Habitat: Forest and shrubland Diet: Invertebrates, as well as small vertebrates	LC Unknown
Swamp antechinus	A. minimus (Geoffroy, 1803)	Southern Australia and Tasmania	Size: 6–19 cm (2–7 in) long, plus 6–16 cm (2–6 in) tail Habitat: Forest, shrubland, grassland, and inland wetlands Diet: Invertebrates, as well as small vertebrates	LC Unknown
Tropical antechinus	A. adustus (Thomas, 1923)	Northern Australia	Size: 7–14 cm (3–6 in) long, plus 6–11 cm (2–4 in) tail Habitat: Forest Diet: Moths, beetles, and other insects, as well as spiders, worms, and small vertebrates such as skinks and frogs	LC Unknown
Yellow-footed antechinus	A. flavipes (Waterhouse, 1838) Two subspecies: A. f. flavipes; A. f. rubeculus	Southwestern and eastern Australia	Size: 8–17 cm (3–7 in) long, plus 6–16 cm (2–6 in) tail Habitat: Forest, savanna, shrubland, and inland wetlands Diet: Insects as well as nectar, mice, and birds	LC Unknown

Genus Dasycercus – Peters, 1875 – two species
Common name	Scientific name and subspecies	Range	Size and ecology	IUCN status and estimated population
Brush-tailed mulgara	D. blythi (Waite, 1904)	Western Australia	Size: 12–23 cm (5–9 in) long, plus 6–13 cm (2–5 in) tail Habitat: Shrubland, grassland, and desert Diet: Invertebrates, reptiles, and small mammals	LC Unknown
Crest-tailed mulgara†	D. cristicauda (Krefft, 1867)	Central Australia	Size: 12–22 cm (5–9 in) long, plus 7–13 cm (3–5 in) tail Habitat: Shrubland, grassland, and desert Diet: Insects, arthropods, and small vertebrates	EX 0

Genus Dasykaluta – Archer, 1982 – one species
Common name	Scientific name and subspecies	Range	Size and ecology	IUCN status and estimated population
Little red kaluta	D. rosamondae (Ride, 1964)	Western Australia	Size: 9–11 cm (4–4 in) long, plus 5–7 cm (2–3 in) tail Habitat: Grassland Diet: Insects, lizards, mice, and other small vertebrates	LC Unknown

Genus Dasyuroides – Spencer, 1896 – one species
Common name	Scientific name and subspecies	Range	Size and ecology	IUCN status and estimated population
Kowari	D. byrnei Spencer, 1896	Northeastern Australia	Size: 13–18 cm (5–7 in) long, plus 11–14 cm (4–6 in) tail Habitat: Shrubland and desert Diet: Invertebrates, as well as rodents, birds, eggs, lizards, and carrion	VU 5,000

Genus Dasyurus – Geoffroy, 1796 – six species
Common name	Scientific name and subspecies	Range	Size and ecology	IUCN status and estimated population
Bronze quoll	D. spartacus Dyck, 1987	Southern New Guinea	Size: 30–38 cm (12–15 in) long, plus 25–29 cm (10–11 in) tail Habitat: Savanna Diet: Insects and small vertebrates	NT Unknown
Eastern quoll	D. viverrinus (Shaw, 1800)	Tasmania	Size: 35–45 cm (14–18 in) long, plus 21–30 cm (8–12 in) tail Habitat: Forest, shrubland, and grassland Diet: Insects, as well as small marsupials, rats, rabbits, mice, carrion, and plants	EN 10,000–12,000
New Guinean quoll	D. albopunctatus Schlegel, 1880	Northern New Guinea	Size: 22–35 cm (9–14 in) long, plus 21–31 cm (8–12 in) tail Habitat: Forest Diet: Insects and small vertebrates	NT Unknown
Northern quoll	D. hallucatus Gould, 1842	Northern Australia	Size: 12–31 cm (5–12 in) long, plus 12–31 cm (5–12 in) tail Habitat: Forest and shrubland Diet: Insects, as well as small mammals, birds, frogs, reptiles, and fruit	EN Unknown
Tiger quoll	D. maculatus (Kerr, 1792)	Eastern Australia	Size: 35–76 cm (14–30 in) long, plus 34–55 cm (13–22 in) tail Habitat: Forest and shrubland Diet: Greater gliders, rabbits, bandicoots, red-necked pademelons, common ringtail possums, and cuscuses, as well as insects, reptiles, and birds	NT 14,000
Western quoll	D. geoffroii Gould, 1841	Southwestern Australia	Size: 36–46 cm (14–18 in) long, plus 22–30 cm (9–12 in) tail Habitat: Forest, shrubland, and desert Diet: Small mammals, birds, reptiles, and invertebrates, as well as plants	NT 5,000–8,000

Genus Murexia – Tate, Archbold, 1937 – five species
Common name	Scientific name and subspecies	Range	Size and ecology	IUCN status and estimated population
Black-tailed dasyure	M. melanurus (Thomas, 1899)	New Guinea	Size: 9–16 cm (4–6 in) long, plus 10–17 cm (4–7 in) tail Habitat: Forest Diet: Insects and spiders, as well as worms and small vertebrates	LC Unknown
Broad-striped dasyure	P. rothschildi Tate, 1938	Eastern New Guinea	Size: 12–17 cm (5–7 in) long, plus 14–19 cm (6–7 in) tail Habitat: Forest Diet: Invertebrates and small vertebrates, including birds	NT Unknown
Habbema dasyure	M. habbema (Tate, Archbold, 1941)	Central New Guinea	Size: 11–13 cm (4–5 in) long, plus 10–16 cm (4–6 in) tail Habitat: Forest and grassland Diet: Insects, worms, and small vertebrates	LC Unknown
Long-nosed dasyure	P. naso (Jentink, 1911)	Central New Guinea	Size: 12–20 cm (5–8 in) long, plus 10–18 cm (4–7 in) tail Habitat: Forest Diet: Insects, spiders, and worms	LC Unknown
Short-furred dasyure	M. longicaudata (Schlegel, 1866)	New Guinea	Size: 13–29 cm (5–11 in) long, plus 14–29 cm (6–11 in) tail Habitat: Forest Diet: Insects	LC Unknown

Genus Myoictis – Gray, 1858 – four species
Common name	Scientific name and subspecies	Range	Size and ecology	IUCN status and estimated population
Tate's three-striped dasyure	M. wavicus Tate, 1947	Eastern New Guinea	Size: 16–25 cm (6–10 in) long, plus 15–23 cm (6–9 in) tail Habitat: Forest Diet: Insects and lizards	DD Unknown
Three-striped dasyure	M. melas (Müller, 1840)	Northern New Guinea	Size: 16–25 cm (6–10 in) long, plus 15–23 cm (6–9 in) tail Habitat: Forest Diet: Insects and lizards	LC Unknown
Wallace's dasyure	M. wallacii Gray, 1858	Southern New Guinea	Size: 16–25 cm (6–10 in) long, plus 15–23 cm (6–9 in) tail Habitat: Forest Diet: Insects and lizards	LC Unknown
Woolley's three-striped dasyure	M. leucura Woolley, 2005	Eastern New Guinea	Size: 16–25 cm (6–10 in) long, plus 15–23 cm (6–9 in) tail Habitat: Forest Diet: Insects and lizards	DD Unknown

Genus Neophascogale – Stein, 1933 – one species
Common name	Scientific name and subspecies	Range	Size and ecology	IUCN status and estimated population
Speckled dasyure	N. lorentzi (Jentink, 1911)	Central New Guinea	Size: 16–23 cm (6–9 in) long, plus 17–22 cm (7–9 in) tail Habitat: Forest and grassland Diet: Insects	LC Unknown

Genus Parantechinus – Tate, 1947 – one species
Common name	Scientific name and subspecies	Range	Size and ecology	IUCN status and estimated population
Dibbler	P. apicalis (Gray, 1842)	Southwestern Australia	Size: 14–15 cm (6 in) long, plus 9–12 cm (4–5 in) tail Habitat: Shrubland Diet: Invertebrates, as well as plants	EN 700

Genus Phascogale – Temminck, 1824 – three species
Common name	Scientific name and subspecies	Range	Size and ecology	IUCN status and estimated population
Brush-tailed phascogale	P. tapoatafa (Meyer, 1793)	Northern, western, and eastern Australia (in green and yellow)	Size: 16–23 cm (6–9 in) long, plus 17–22 cm (7–9 in) tail Habitat: Forest and savanna Diet: Invertebrates, as well as nectar	NT 15,000
Red-tailed phascogale	P. calura Gould, 1844	Southwestern Australia	Size: 9–13 cm (4–5 in) long, plus 11–15 cm (4–6 in) tail Habitat: Forest, savanna, and shrubland Diet: Insects and spiders, as well as small mammals, birds, and lizards	NT 5,000–20,000
Northern brush-tailed phascogale	P. pirata Thomas, 1904	Northern Australia (current range in dark green)	Size: 15–21 cm (6–8 in) long, plus 18–21 cm (7–8 in) tail Habitat: Forest Diet: Insects and spiders, as well as small mammals, birds, and lizards	VU 1,000–10,000

Genus Phascolosorex – Matschie, 1916 – two species
Common name	Scientific name and subspecies	Range	Size and ecology	IUCN status and estimated population
Narrow-striped marsupial shrew	P. dorsalis (Peters, Doria, 1876) Three subspecies: P. d. brevicaudata; P. d. dorsalis; P. d. whartoni	Central New Guinea	Size: 13–17 cm (5–7 in) long, plus 11–16 cm (4–6 in) tail Habitat: Forest Diet: Insects and arthropods, as well as small vertebrates	LC Unknown
Red-bellied marsupial shrew	P. doriae (Thomas, 1886)	Western New Guinea	Size: 11–23 cm (4–9 in) long, plus 11–20 cm (4–8 in) tail Habitat: Forest Diet: Believed to be insects and arthropods, as well as small vertebrates	LC Unknown

Genus Pseudantechinus – Tate, 1947 – six species
Common name	Scientific name and subspecies	Range	Size and ecology	IUCN status and estimated population
Alexandria false antechinus	P. mimulus (Thomas, 1906)	Central Australia	Size: 6–12 cm (2–5 in) long, plus 5–13 cm (2–5 in) tail Habitat: Savanna, shrubland, grassland, and rocky areas Diet: Insects	NT 5,000–30,000
Fat-tailed false antechinus	P. macdonnellensis (Spencer, 1896)	Central Australia	Size: 7–11 cm (3–4 in) long, plus 6–9 cm (2–4 in) tail Habitat: Savanna, shrubland, rocky areas, and desert Diet: Insects, as well as other invertebrates and rodents	LC Unknown
Ningbing false antechinus	P. ningbing Kitchener, 1988	Northern Australia	Size: 6–12 cm (2–5 in) long, plus 5–13 cm (2–5 in) tail Habitat: Forest, savanna, shrubland, and rocky areas Diet: Insects	LC Unknown
Rory Cooper's false antechinus	P. roryi Cooper, Aplin, Adams, 2000	Northwestern Australia	Size: 6–12 cm (2–5 in) long, plus 5–13 cm (2–5 in) tail Habitat: Desert and rocky areas Diet: Insects	LC Unknown
Sandstone false antechinus	P. bilarni (Johnson, 1954)	Northern Australia	Size: 6–12 cm (2–5 in) long, plus 5–13 cm (2–5 in) tail Habitat: Forest, savanna, and rocky areas Diet: Insects	NT 10,000–100,000
Woolley's false antechinus	P. woolleyae Kitchener, 1988	Western Australia	Size: 6–12 cm (2–5 in) long, plus 5–13 cm (2–5 in) tail Habitat: Desert, rocky areas, and shrubland Diet: Insects	LC Unknown

Genus Sarcophilus – F. Cuvier, 1837 – one species
Common name	Scientific name and subspecies	Range	Size and ecology	IUCN status and estimated population
Tasmanian devil	S. harrisii (Boitard, 1841) Two subspecies: S. h. dixonae; S. h. harrisii	Tasmania	Size: 52–80 cm (20–31 in) long, plus 23–30 cm (9–12 in) tail Habitat: Forest, shrubland, grassland, and non-aquatic caves and subterranean habitats Diet: Carrion, as well as insects, larvae, snakes, and plants	EN Unknown

==== Subfamily Sminthopsinae ====
Genus Antechinomys – Krefft, 1867 – one species
Common name	Scientific name and subspecies	Range	Size and ecology	IUCN status and estimated population
Kultarr	A. laniger (Gould, 1856)	Central Australia	Size: 7–10 cm (3–4 in) long, plus 10–15 cm (4–6 in) tail Habitat: Savanna, shrubland, grassland, and desert Diet: Spiders, cockroaches, and crickets	LC 20,000–100,000

Genus Ningaui – Archer, 1975 – three species
Common name	Scientific name and subspecies	Range	Size and ecology	IUCN status and estimated population
Pilbara ningaui	N. timealeyi Archer, 1975	Northwestern Australia	Size: 4–8 cm (2–3 in) long, plus 5–10 cm (2–4 in) tail Habitat: Grassland, rocky areas, and desert Diet: Insects, other invertebrates, and possibly small vertebrates	LC 10,000–50,000
Southern ningaui	N. yvonnae Kitchener, Stoddart, Henry, 1983	Southern Australia	Size: 4–6 cm (2 in) long, plus 4–6 cm (2 in) tail Habitat: Grassland and shrubland Diet: Insects and arthropods, as well as reptiles	LC Unknown
Wongai ningaui	N. ridei Archer, 1975	Central Australia	Size: 4–8 cm (2–3 in) long, plus 5–10 cm (2–4 in) tail Habitat: Savanna, shrubland, and grassland Diet: Insects, other invertebrates, and possibly small vertebrates	LC Unknown

Genus Planigale – Troughton, 1928 – five species
Common name	Scientific name and subspecies	Range	Size and ecology	IUCN status and estimated population
Common planigale	P. maculata (Gould, 1851) Two subspecies: P. m. maculata; P. m. sinualis	Northern and eastern Australia	Size: 5–10 cm (2–4 in) long, plus 4–9 cm (2–4 in) tail Habitat: Forest, grassland, inland wetlands, and rocky areas Diet: Insects, spiders, small lizards, and small mammals	LC Unknown
Long-tailed planigale	P. ingrami (Thomas, 1906) Three subspecies: P. i. brunnea; P. i. ingrami; P. i. subtilissima	Northern and central Australia	Size: 5–10 cm (2–4 in) long, plus 4–9 cm (2–4 in) tail Habitat: Savanna and grassland Diet: Invertebrates, as well as small vertebrates	LC Unknown
Narrow-nosed planigale	P. tenuirostris Troughton, 1928	Central eastern Australia	Size: 5–10 cm (2–4 in) long, plus 4–9 cm (2–4 in) tail Habitat: Shrubland and grassland Diet: Insects and arthropods, as well as small lizards	LC Unknown
New Guinean planigale	P. novaeguineae Tate, Archbold, 1941	Southern New Guinea	Size: 5–10 cm (2–4 in) long, plus 4–9 cm (2–4 in) tail Habitat: Savanna and grassland Diet: Insects, spiders, small lizards, and small mammals	LC Unknown
Paucident planigale	P. gilesi Aitken, 1972	Central eastern Australia	Size: 5–10 cm (2–4 in) long, plus 4–9 cm (2–4 in) tail Habitat: Shrubland and grassland Diet: Insects, spiders, small lizards, and small mammals	LC Unknown

Genus Sminthopsis – Thomas, 1887 – 19 species
Common name	Scientific name and subspecies	Range	Size and ecology	IUCN status and estimated population
Carpentarian dunnart	S. butleri Archer, 1979	Northern Australia	Size: 4–14 cm (2–6 in) long, plus 4–13 cm (2–5 in) tail Habitat: Forest and shrubland Diet: Insects, as well as small vertebrates such as lizards and mice	VU 20,000
Chestnut dunnart	S. archeri Dyck, 1986	Northern Australia and southern New Guinea	Size: 4–14 cm (2–6 in) long, plus 4–13 cm (2–5 in) tail Habitat: Forest and savanna Diet: Insects, as well as small vertebrates such as lizards and mice	DD Unknown
Fat-tailed dunnart	S. crassicaudata (Gould, 1844)	Australia	Size: 6–11 cm (2–4 in) long, plus 5–12 cm (2–5 in) tail Habitat: Savanna, shrubland, grassland, and desert Diet: Grasshoppers, moths, and beetles	LC Unknown
Gilbert's dunnart	S. gilberti Kitchener, Stoddart, Henry, 1984	Southwestern Australia	Size: 4–14 cm (2–6 in) long, plus 4–13 cm (2–5 in) tail Habitat: Forest and shrubland Diet: Insects, as well as small vertebrates such as lizards and mice	LC Unknown
Grey-bellied dunnart	S. griseoventer Kitchener, Stoddart, Henry, 1984	Southwestern Australia	Size: 4–14 cm (2–6 in) long, plus 4–13 cm (2–5 in) tail Habitat: Forest, shrubland, and inland wetlands Diet: Insects, as well as small vertebrates such as lizards and mice	LC Unknown
Hairy-footed dunnart	S. hirtipes Thomas, 1898	Western central Australia	Size: 4–14 cm (2–6 in) long, plus 4–13 cm (2–5 in) tail Habitat: Forest, savanna, shrubland, and grassland Diet: Insects, as well as small vertebrates such as lizards and mice	LC Unknown
Julia Creek dunnart	S. douglasi Archer, 1979	Northeastern Australia	Size: 4–14 cm (2–6 in) long, plus 4–13 cm (2–5 in) tail Habitat: Savanna, shrubland, and grassland Diet: Insects, as well as small vertebrates such as lizards and mice	NT 20,000
Kakadu dunnart	S. bindi Dyck, Woinarski & Press, 1994	Northern Australia	Size: 4–14 cm (2–6 in) long, plus 4–13 cm (2–5 in) tail Habitat: Forest, savanna, and grassland Diet: Insects, as well as small vertebrates such as lizards and mice	NT 5,000–50,000
Lesser hairy-footed dunnart	S. youngsoni McKenzie, Archer, 1982	Western and central Australia	Size: 4–14 cm (2–6 in) long, plus 4–13 cm (2–5 in) tail Habitat: Shrubland, grassland, and desert Diet: Insects, as well as small vertebrates such as lizards and mice	LC Unknown
Little long-tailed dunnart	S. dolichura Kitchener, Stoddart, Henry, 1984	Southwestern Australia	Size: 4–14 cm (2–6 in) long, plus 4–13 cm (2–5 in) tail Habitat: Forest, savanna, shrubland, and grassland Diet: Insects, as well as small vertebrates such as lizards and mice	LC 10,000–20,000
Long-tailed dunnart	S. longicaudata Spencer, 1909	Western Australia	Size: 8–10 cm (3–4 in) long, plus 18–21 cm (7–8 in) tail Habitat: Shrubland, grassland, and rocky areas Diet: Insects and arthropods, as well as lizards, mice, and other small vertebrates	LC Unknown
Ooldea dunnart	S. ooldea Troughton, 1965	Western central Australia	Size: 4–14 cm (2–6 in) long, plus 4–13 cm (2–5 in) tail Habitat: Savanna, shrubland, grassland, and desert Diet: Insects, as well as small vertebrates such as lizards and mice	LC Unknown
Red-cheeked dunnart	S. virginiae de Tarragon, 1847 Three subspecies: S. v. nitela; S. v. rufigenis; S. v. virginiae	Northern Australia and southern New Guinea	Size: 4–14 cm (2–6 in) long, plus 4–13 cm (2–5 in) tail Habitat: Savanna, grassland, and inland wetlands Diet: Insects, as well as small vertebrates such as lizards and mice	LC Unknown
Sandhill dunnart	S. psammophila Spencer, 1895	Southern Australia	Size: 4–14 cm (2–6 in) long, plus 4–13 cm (2–5 in) tail Habitat: Shrubland and grassland Diet: Wide variety of small to medium-sized invertebrates	VU 5,000–10,000
Slender-tailed dunnart	S. murina (Waterhouse, 1838)	Eastern Australia	Size: 4–14 cm (2–6 in) long, plus 4–13 cm (2–5 in) tail Habitat: Forest, savanna, and shrubland Diet: Insects, as well as small vertebrates such as lizards and mice	LC Unknown
Sooty dunnart	S. fuliginosus (Gould, 1852)	Southwestern Australia	Size: 4–14 cm (2–6 in) long, plus 4–13 cm (2–5 in) tail Habitat: Forest and savanna Diet: Insects, as well as small vertebrates such as lizards and mice	LC Unknown
Stripe-faced dunnart	S. macroura (Gould, 1845)	Australia	Size: 7–12 cm (3–5 in) long, plus 5–13 cm (2–5 in) tail Habitat: Savanna, shrubland, grassland, and desert Diet: Insects, as well as small vertebrates	LC Unknown
White-footed dunnart	S. leucopus (Gray, 1842)	Northern and southern Australia and Tasmania	Size: 4–14 cm (2–6 in) long, plus 4–13 cm (2–5 in) tail Habitat: Forest, savanna, shrubland, and grassland Diet: Insects, as well as small vertebrates such as lizards and mice	LC 8,000–10,000
White-tailed dunnart	S. granulipes Troughton, 1932	Southwestern Australia	Size: 4–14 cm (2–6 in) long, plus 4–13 cm (2–5 in) tail Habitat: Shrubland Diet: Insects, as well as small vertebrates such as lizards and mice	LC Unknown

=== Myrmecobiidae ===
Genus Myrmecobius – Waterhouse, 1836 – one species
Common name	Scientific name and subspecies	Range	Size and ecology	IUCN status and estimated population
Numbat	M. fasciatus Waterhouse, 1836 Two subspecies: M. f. fasciatus; M. f. rufus	Scattered southwestern and southern Australia	Size: 17–29 cm (7–11 in) long, plus 12–21 cm (5–8 in) tail Habitat: Forest, savanna, shrubland, and desert Diet: Termites	NT 2,000–3,000

=== Thylacinidae ===
Genus Thylacinus† – Temminck, 1824 – one species
Common name	Scientific name and subspecies	Range	Size and ecology	IUCN status and estimated population
Thylacine†	T. cynocephalus (Harris, 1810)	Tasmania	Size: 123–195 cm (48–77 in) long, plus 50–66 cm (20–26 in) tail Habitat: Forest and grassland Diet: Mammals such as wallabies, potoroos, bettongs, and livestock	EX Unknown

== Sources ==
- Baker, Andrew; Dickman, Chris (2018). Secret Lives of Carnivorous Marsupials. CSIRO Publishing. ISBN 978-1-4863-0516-2.
- Nowak, Ronald M. (2018). Walker's Mammals of the World. Vol. Monotremes, Marsupials, Afrotherians, Xenarthrans, and Sundatherians. Johns Hopkins University Press. ISBN 978-1-4214-2468-2.
- Turner, Jim (2004). Mammals of Australia. Pensoft Publishers. ISBN 978-954-642-198-2.
- Groves, Colin P. (2005). Wilson, Don E.; Reeder, DeeAnn M. (eds.). Mammal Species of the World. Vol. 1 (3rd ed.). Johns Hopkins University Press. ISBN 978-0-8018-8221-0.
