= List of mice =

Mice are small rodents classified in the order Rodentia. There are several types of rodents termed mice found throughout the order. For a list of all rodent species, see list of rodents.

- Old World mice or "true mice" are found in the family Muridae, with typical mice belonging to the genus Mus in the Murinae subfamily.
  - For members of the subfamily Deomyinae, which includes spiny mice, see List of deomyines
  - For the sole member of the subfamily Leimacomyinae, see Togo mouse
  - For members of the subfamily Murinae, which includes a large number of Old World mice, see List of murines
- New World mice are found in the family Cricetidae
  - For members of the subfamily Neotominae, which includes deer mice and grasshopper mice, see List of neotomines
  - For members of the subfamily Sigmodontinae, which contains a variety of New World mice, see List of sigmodontines
- Two species of the family Anomaluridae, typically named the scaly-tailed squirrels, are called the flying mice
- Members of the family Calomyscidae are typically named mouse-like hamsters, but are sometimes called brush-tailed mice
- For members of the family Gliridae, known as dormice, see List of glirids
- For members of the family Heteromyidae, which includes kangaroo mice, pocket mice, and spiny pocket mice, see List of heteromyids
- For members of the family Nesomyidae, which includes climbing mice and African rock mice, see List of nesomyids
- For members of the family Sminthidae, known as the birch mice, see List of sminthids

Additionally, for the small non-rodent marsupials in the family Dasyuridae, sometimes called marsupial mice, see List of dasyuromorphs
