= Cinnamon antechinus =

Cinnamon Antechinus

Conservation status
- Least Concern (IUCN 3.1)

Scientific classification
- Kingdom: Animalia
- Phylum: Chordata
- Class: Mammalia
- Infraclass: Marsupialia
- Order: Dasyuromorphia
- Family: Dasyuridae
- Genus: Antechinus
- Species: A. leo

Binomial name
- Antechinus leo Van Dyck, 1980
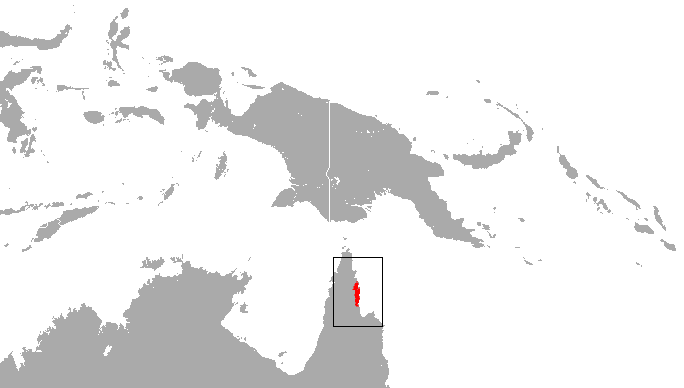
- Cinnamon Antechinus range

Species of marsupial

The cinnamon antechinus (Antechinus leo), also known as the Iron Ranges antechinus and the Cape York antechinus, is a species of small carnivorous marsupial of the family Dasyuridae. It is the only mammal endemic to Cape York Peninsula, being confined to semideciduous forest around the McIlraith and Iron Ranges. Along with the Atherton antechinus (Antechinus godmani), it is the rarest in its genus.

== Taxonomy ==
The cinnamon antechinus was not scientifically described until 1980. It had previously been confused with both the yellow-footed antechinus (A. flavipes rubeculus) and the Atherton antechinus (A. godmani). A member of the dasyurid family, the species name of the cinnamon antechinus, leo, refers to the lion-like cinnamon colour of its fur.

== Description ==
The cinnamon antechinus is one of the largest of the antechinuses, and is more rufous than its relatives. It is nocturnal and arboreal, and feeds on various invertebrates. Like all antechinuses, the males die following the breeding season.

The cinnamon antechinus, as its name implies, has mostly cinnamon-coloured fur, although it does have a darker mid-head stripe. Its mating season is in September.

== Distribution and habitat ==
The cinnamon antechinus has a very restricted range, being completely confined to a small area on Cape York Peninsula, where it inhabits semideciduous rainforest. Despite being locally common, it was once classed as near threatened by the IUCN due to the limits of its distribution.
