= Black-tailed antechinus =

Black-tailed antechinus may refer to:

- Antechinus arktos (Black-tailed antechinus, Baker et al., 2014), small Australian marsupial discovered in 2014
- Black-tailed dasyure, (Murexechinus melanurus), small New Guinean marsupial
