= Tasman Peninsula dusky antechinus =

Scientific classification
- Kingdom: Animalia
- Phylum: Chordata
- Class: Mammalia
- Infraclass: Marsupialia
- Order: Dasyuromorphia
- Family: Dasyuridae
- Genus: Antechinus
- Species: A. vandycki

Binomial name
- Antechinus vandycki Baker, Mutton, Mason and Gray, 2015

Species of marsupial

Antechinus vandycki, the Tasman Peninsula dusky antechinus, is a species of marsupial in the family Dasyuridae. It was first described in 2015 by Andrew Baker and his group of scientists in southeast Tasmania. In October 2021, only eight specimens were known.

== Description ==
It is large compared to other members of the genus, measuring 13 centimetres (5.1 in) from head to body, and weighing 90 grams (3.2 oz). Its tail no longer than its torso and head. As for its colouration, it mostly appears with a mix of brown and grey, with some colour variation on its torso and tail.

== Reproduction ==
Breeding seasons last around two to three weeks, in which the males' testosterone is known to cause excess production of stress hormones; this proves to be lethal, killing the male before any parturition occurs, practically halving the population.

== Distribution, habitat and other information ==
This marsupial has been found in the region of Tasmania known as the Tasman Peninsula, although it is possible it also resides in the Forestier Peninsula. It is located in forests; its habitat is prone to deforestation. The Department of Natural Resources and Environment Tasmania describes the habitat of Antechinus vandycki as "eucalypt forest and sclerophyll rainforest".

=== Other information ===
The Tasman Peninsula dusky antechinus' diet consists mainly of invertebrates, such as spiders and insects. It is a threatened species (listed as "vulnerable"), as logging hurts its habitat. It was named in honour of the Senior Curator of Mammals and Birds at Queensland Museum, Steve Van Dyck.
