= Antechinus arktos =

Black-tailed antechinus

Scientific classification
- Kingdom: Animalia
- Phylum: Chordata
- Class: Mammalia
- Infraclass: Marsupialia
- Order: Dasyuromorphia
- Family: Dasyuridae
- Genus: Antechinus
- Species: A. arktos

Binomial name
- Antechinus arktos Baker et al, 2014

Species of marsupial

Antechinus arktos, the black-tailed antechinus, is a species of small carnivorous marsupial native to Australia.

== Taxonomy ==
The black-tailed antechinus was first described in 2014 by Baker and others and is one of the most recently described marsupials.

It had previously been described as Antechinus swainsonii mimetes, a subspecies of the Dusky antechinus.

A member of the dasyurid family, the Black-Tailed antechinus is a member of the genus Antechinus, of which it is thought to be one of the most restricted members, located only at high altitudes in far north-eastern New south Wales and the adjoining ranges in south-eastern Queensland.

== Description ==
Dr. Andrew Baker from the Queensland University of Technology reports: "The tail emerges from a body that is very shaggy, very hairy, with really long guard hairs. On the rump of the animal it becomes almost an orangey-brown colour, but where the tail emerges from the rump there is quite a distinct change from orange rump to black tail. It's a very short-furred tail and they have black feet as well."

== Distribution and habitat ==
The species has so far only been found in high-altitude, wet areas in the Springbrook National Park between northern New South Wales and the Gold Coast Hinterland. Dr. Andrew Baker from the Queensland University of Technology reports that, though the species is already endangered, "it seems that the species may now be restricted to the highest parts of the Tweed Volcano Caldera, such as the upper parts of Springbrook where [they] successfully captured the species in May 2013. The most likely explanation for such a contraction is climate change."

== Mating habits ==
Dr. Diana Fisher from the University of Queensland reported in a study published last year in the Journal Proceedings of the National Academy of Sciences that:

. . . the animals were actually over-doing it in order to promote their own genes over their competitors' genes, and trying so hard to reproduce that their bodies shut down. "What they do is just competitively mate, so they mate for a very long time, like 12 to 14 hours, some of the species," she said. "They do it over and over and over - they're very promiscuous. There's this huge intense mating season going on for about two weeks."

Dr Fisher says the males experience an escalation of stress hormones, which allows them to continue mating for a long time. But the researchers found the extreme rush of stress hormones also caused the animals' body tissues to "disintegrate".

"It's a bit distressing to see them die. Their fur falls off. They look very sick and stagger around, and sometimes they get gangrene infections because their immune system stops working."
