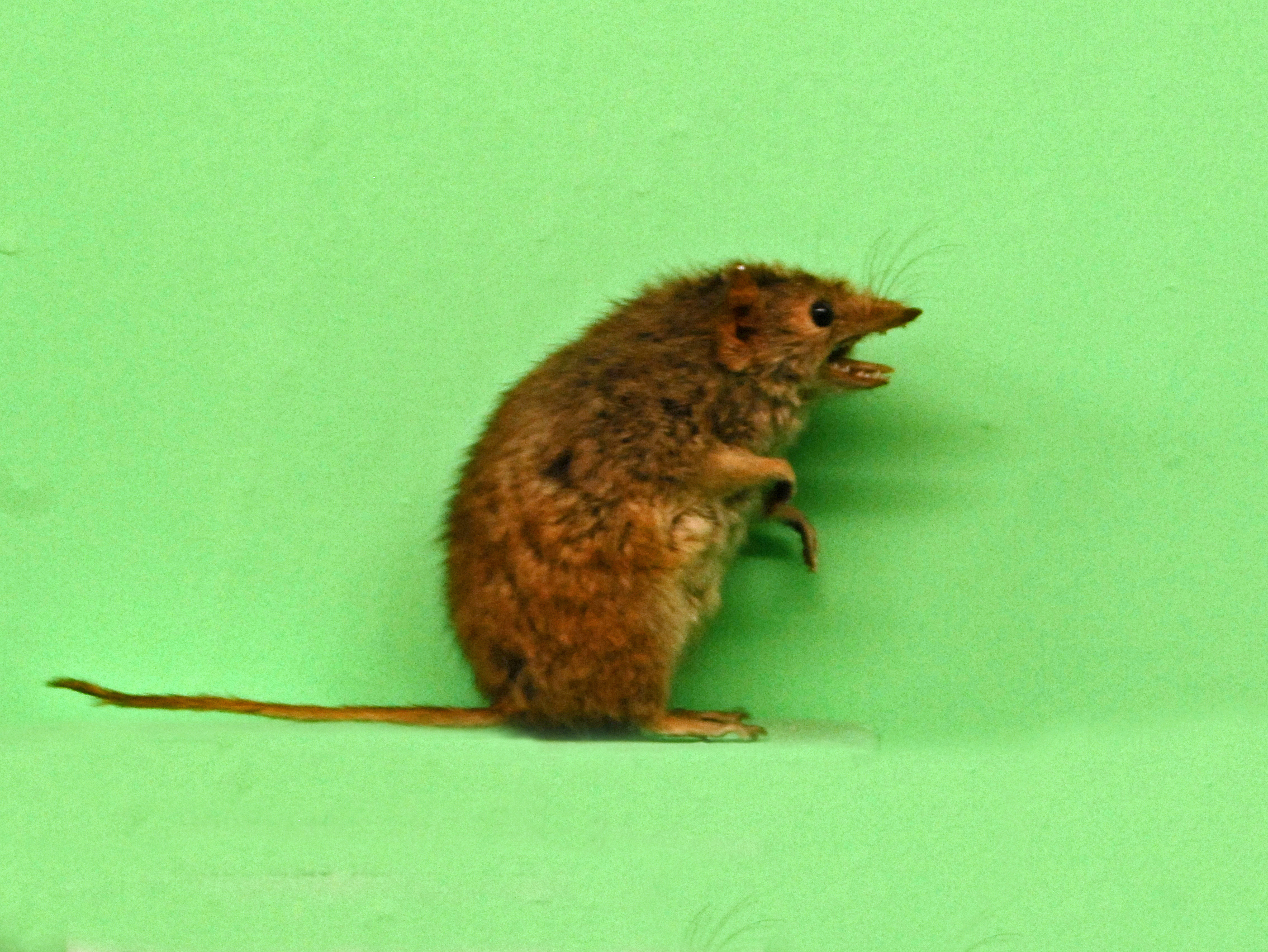
- Antechinus minimus from Tasmania. Stuffed specimen

Conservation status
- Least Concern (IUCN 3.1)

Scientific classification
- Kingdom: Animalia
- Phylum: Chordata
- Class: Mammalia
- Infraclass: Marsupialia
- Order: Dasyuromorphia
- Family: Dasyuridae
- Genus: Antechinus
- Species: A. minimus

Binomial name
- Antechinus minimus (É. Geoffroy, 1803)
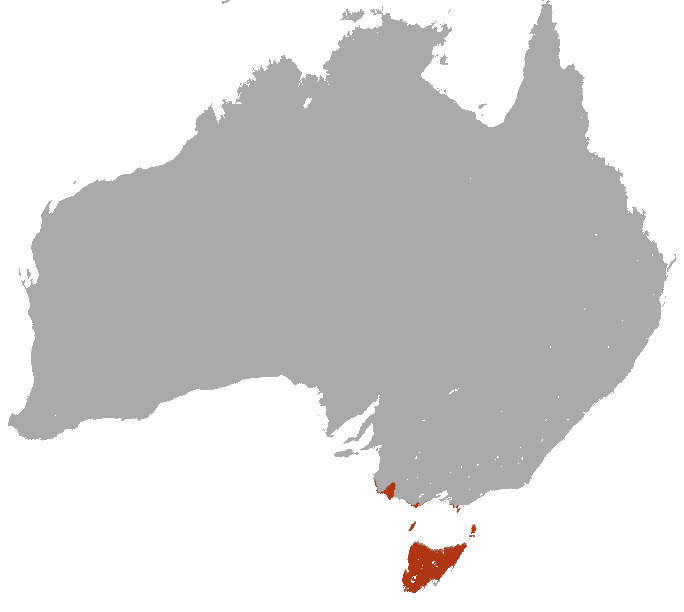
- Swamp antechinus range

= Swamp antechinus =

Species of marsupial

The swamp antechinus (Antechinus minimus), also known as the little Tasmanian marsupial mouse, is a species of shrew-like marsupial of the family Dasyuridae and as such is related to dunnarts, quolls and the Tasmanian devil.

== Taxonomy ==
The swamp antechinus was first described in 1803 (the first of all the antechinuses) by Étienne Geoffroy Saint-Hilaire, who placed it in the genus Dasyurus (quolls), hence its species name minimus, which means "smallest".

There are two recognised subspecies of the Swamp Antechinus:

- A. m. minimus, found in Tasmania and Bass Strait;
- A. m. maritimus, found on the mainland; this subspecies is declining and is classed as near threatened.

== Habitat and distribution ==
The area inhabited by the subspecies A. m. maritimus is in the south of the central highlands, Wimmera and Alpine areas of Victoria and the extreme south of South Australia around Mount Gambier. For the nominate subspecies A. m. minimus, the range is Tasmania, including Sunday Island, King Island and Flinders Island.

The habitat for all subspecies is closed heath, wet dense heath, open forest, open heath, swampy drainages and tussock grassland with bracken and sedge growth.

== Breeding and social habits ==
The species is nocturnal and partly diurnal or active at night and daytime, whether it is crepuscular is not known. The species breeds during May–July and gives birth in July–August after 28–32 days gestation to 6–8 joeys. In the inland areas, mating occurs one month earlier, but the reason is not known. Few females survive a second year and all males do not live long past the mating period (Wilson et al. 1986).

== Diet ==
The swamp antechinus is an insectivorous forager in soil habitats similar to the dusky antechinus.
