= Silver-headed antechinus =

Scientific classification
- Kingdom: Animalia
- Phylum: Chordata
- Class: Mammalia
- Infraclass: Marsupialia
- Order: Dasyuromorphia
- Family: Dasyuridae
- Genus: Antechinus
- Species: A. argentus

Binomial name
- Antechinus argentus Baker, Mutton, Hines, 2013
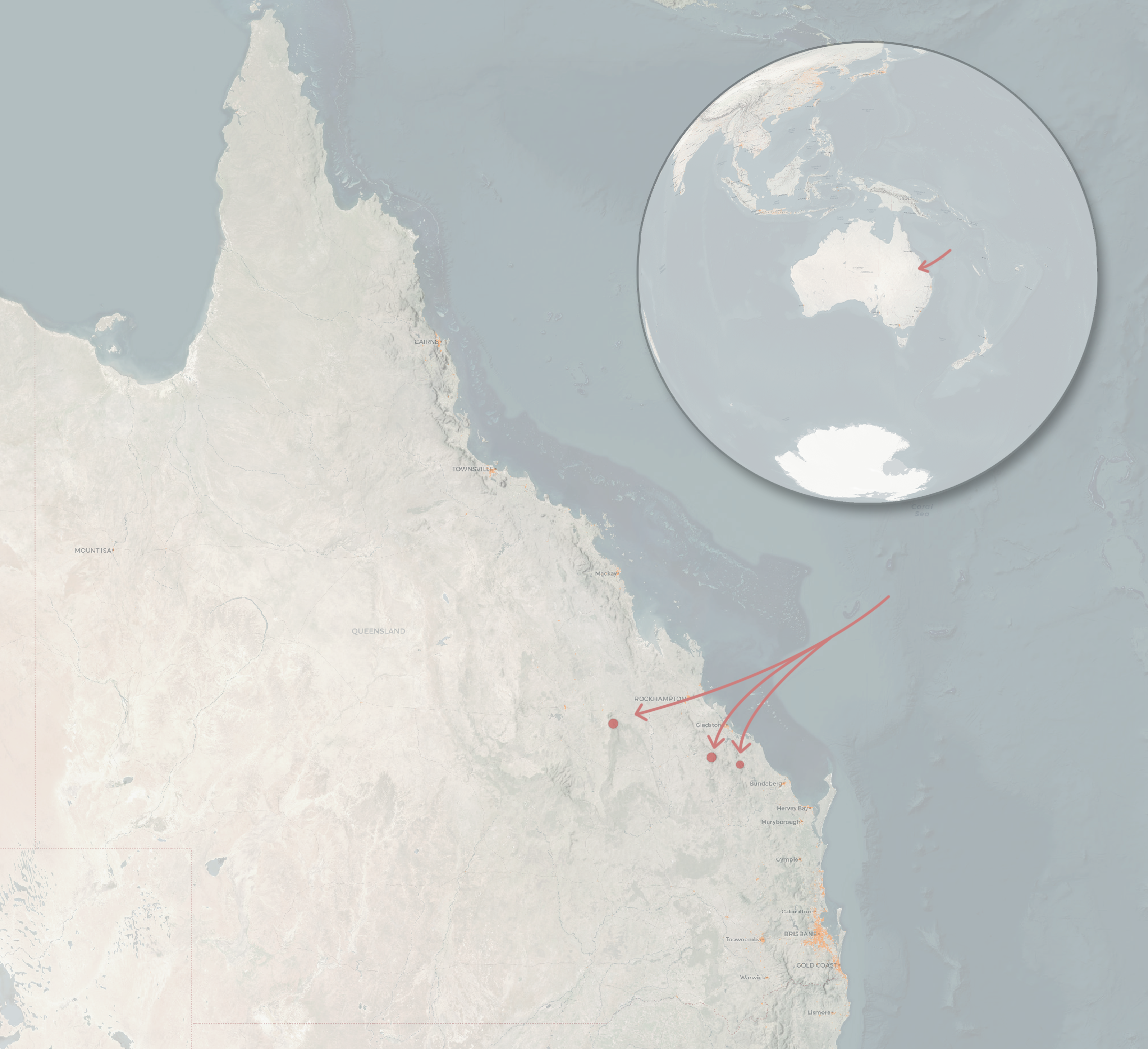
- The approximate range of the Silver-headed Antechinus

Species of marsupial

The silver-headed antechinus (Antechinus argentus) is a species of dasyurid marsupial of the genus Antechinus. Described in 2013, the species is known only from three locations so far: Blackdown Tableland National Park, Kroombit Tops National Park and Bulburin National Park in central Queensland. It is one of the most recently described Australian marsupials.
