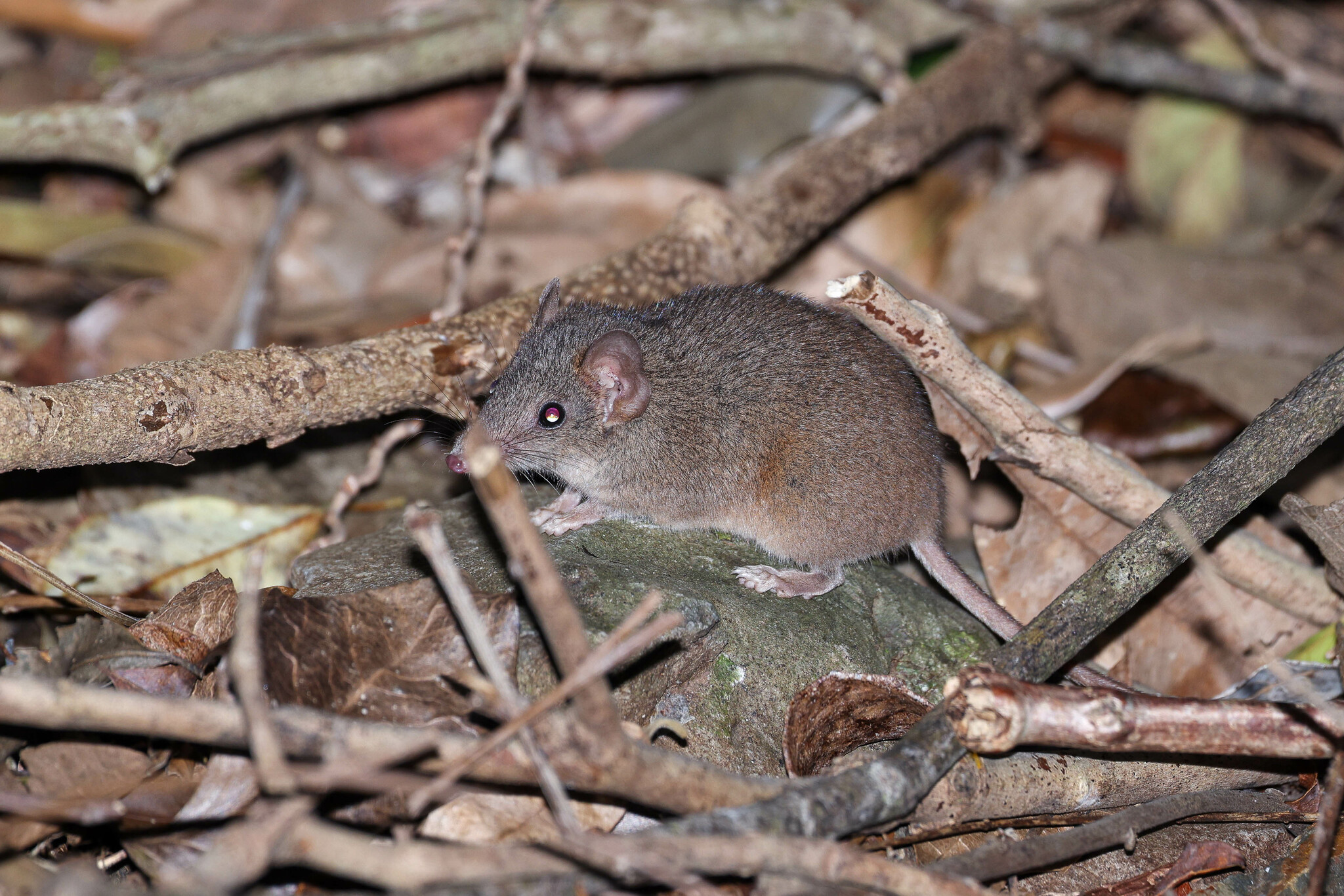

Conservation status
- Least Concern (IUCN 3.1)

Scientific classification
- Kingdom: Animalia
- Phylum: Chordata
- Class: Mammalia
- Infraclass: Marsupialia
- Order: Dasyuromorphia
- Family: Dasyuridae
- Genus: Antechinus
- Species: A. mysticus

Binomial name
- Antechinus mysticus Baker, Mutton & Van Dyck, 2012

= Buff-footed antechinus =

Species of marsupial

The buff-footed antechinus (Antechinus mysticus) is a species of marsupial.
