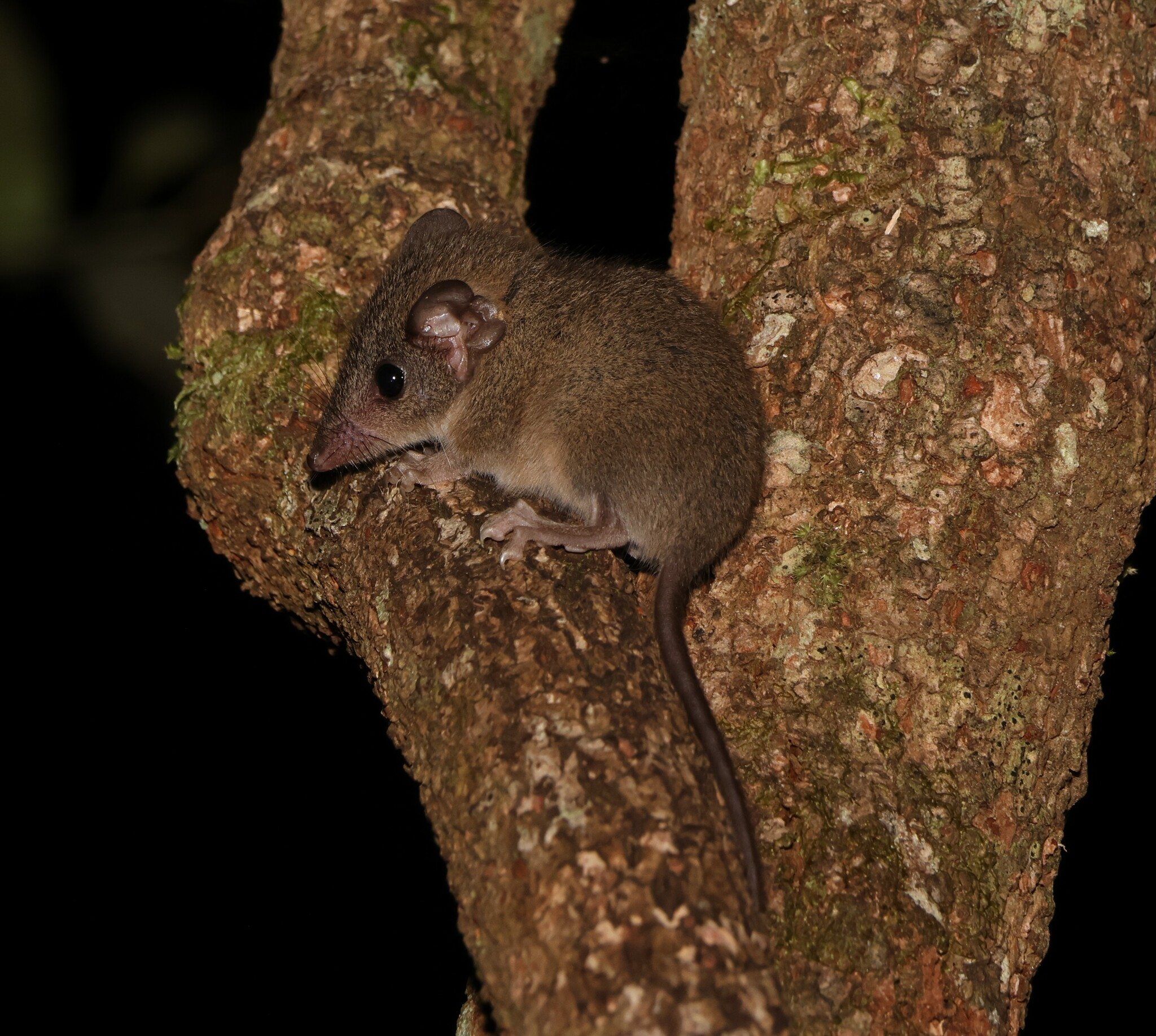

Conservation status
- Least Concern (IUCN 3.1)

Scientific classification
- Kingdom: Animalia
- Phylum: Chordata
- Class: Mammalia
- Infraclass: Marsupialia
- Order: Dasyuromorphia
- Family: Dasyuridae
- Genus: Antechinus
- Species: A. subtropicus

Binomial name
- Antechinus subtropicus Van Dyck & Crowther, 2000
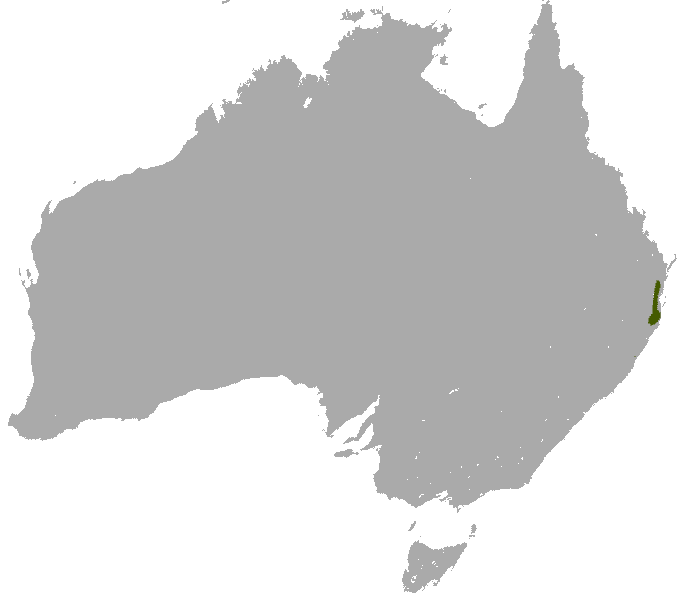
- Subtropical antechinus range

= Subtropical antechinus =

Species of marsupial

The subtropical antechinus (Antechinus subtropicus) is a species of small carnivorous marsupial of the family Dasyuridae.

== Taxonomy ==
It was previously thought to be conspecific with the brown antechinus (Antechinus stuartii).

== Description ==
It is difficult to distinguish it from its close relatives, but its significant features include a long and narrow muzzle and a generally mid-brown colour. It is the largest of the brown antechinus complex. It mainly eats insects and after mating, all of the males die of stress-related diseases, like many other species in this family.

== Distribution and habitat ==
The subtropical antechinus is found south from Gympie in Queensland, Australia, to the far northeast of New South Wales, where it is essentially restricted to subtropical vine forest below 1000 m elevation. A relict population is also found in Dorrigo National Park.
