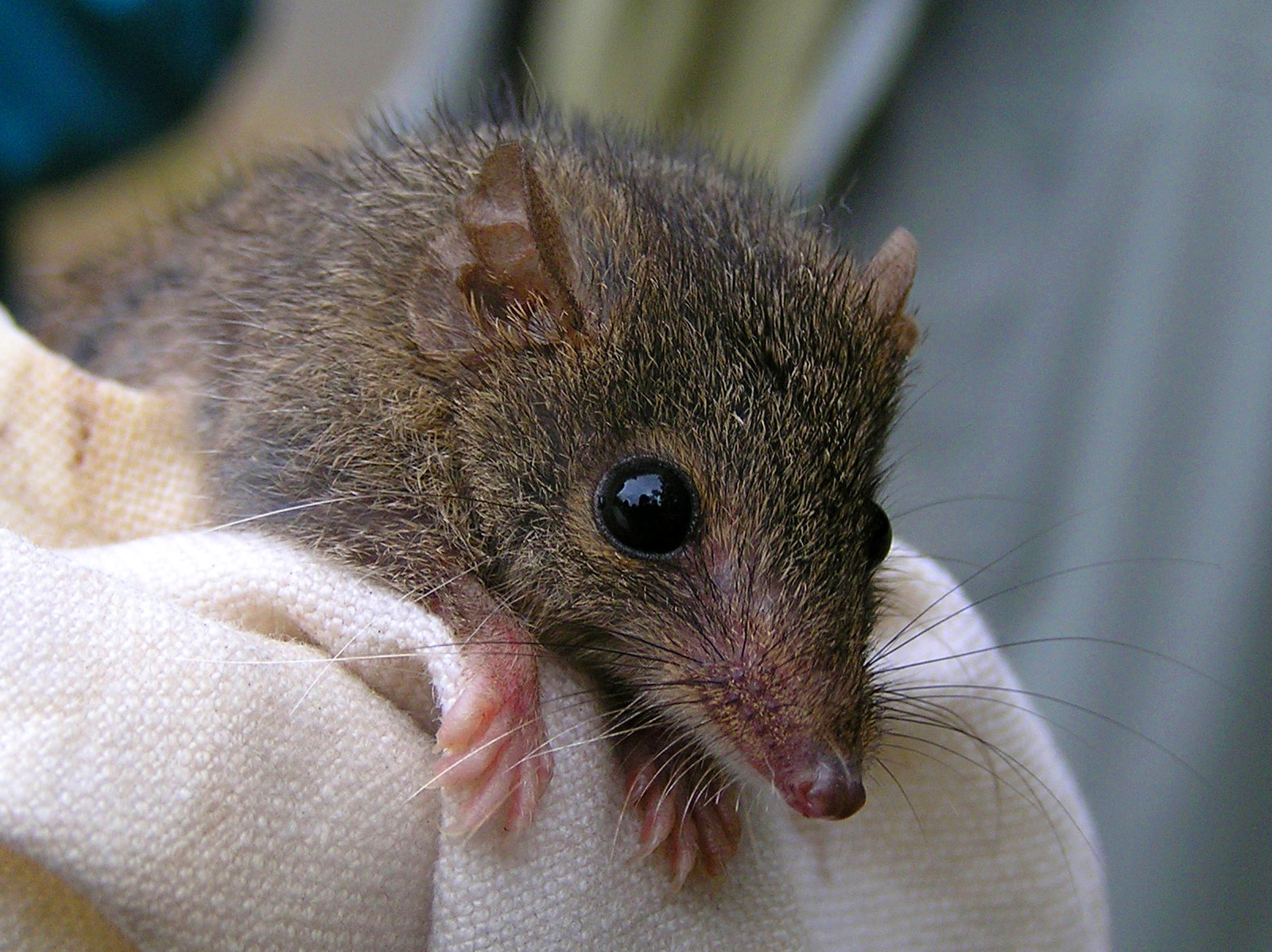

Scientific classification
- Kingdom: Animalia
- Phylum: Chordata
- Class: Mammalia
- Infraclass: Marsupialia
- Order: Dasyuromorphia
- Family: Dasyuridae
- Subfamily: Dasyurinae
- Tribe: Phascogalini
- Genus: Antechinus; Macleay, 1841

Type species
- Antechinus stuartii Macleay, 1841

Species
- A. adustus; A. agilis; A. argentus; A. arktos; A. bellus; A. flavipes; A. godmani; A. leo; A. mimetes; A. minimus; A. mysticus; A. stuartii; A. subtropicus; A. swainsonii; A. vandycki

= Antechinus =

Genus of marsupials

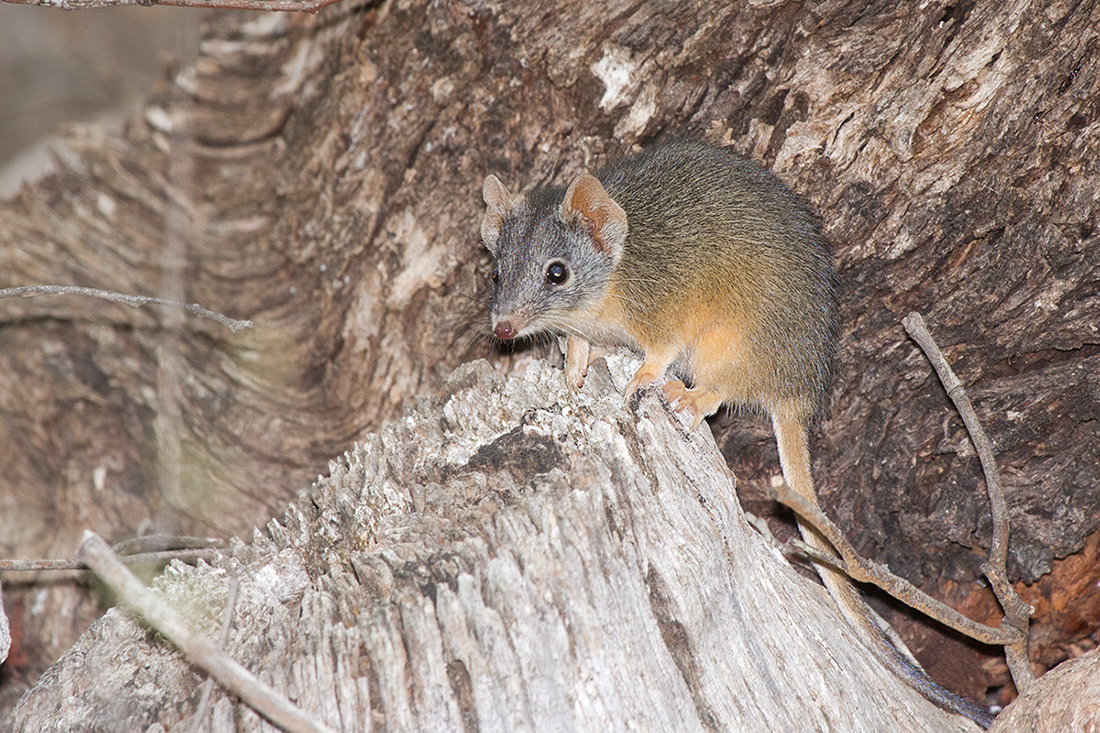
In central Victoria

Antechinus (/æntɪˈkaɪnəs/, 'ant-echinus') is a genus of small dasyurid marsupial endemic to Australia. They resemble mice with the bristly fur of shrews.

== Names ==
They are also sometimes called 'broad-footed marsupial mice', 'pouched mice', or 'Antechinus shrews'. However, the majority of those common names are considered either regional or archaic; the modern common name for the animal is antechinus.

== Description ==
Antechinus have short fur and are generally greyish or brownish in colour, varying with species. The fur is dense and generally soft. Their tails are thin and tapering and range from slightly shorter to slightly longer than body length. Their heads are conical in shape and ears are small to medium in size. Some species have a relatively long, narrow snout that gives them a shrew-like appearance. Species vary from 12–31 cm (4.7–12.2 in) in length and weigh 16–170 g (0.56–6.00 oz) when fully grown. A. agilis is the smallest known species, and A. swainsonii the largest.

Sexual dimorphism occurs in most species for both weight and skeletal measurements, with males being typically larger and heavier.

Most species nest communally in tree-hollows. They primarily inhabit all forests, woodlands and rainforest as well as heaths and grasslands in some species. The majority of Antechinus species are located on the eastern coast of Australia along the Great Dividing Range. There is a population of A. flavipes in south west Western Australia. A. bellus lives in northern Australia around the Gulf of Carpentaria.

== Taxonomy ==
There are currently 15 recognised species of Antechinus with a number of subspecies. A few species of New Guinean Antechinus were recognised, but they have been reclassified into the genus Murexia. The interspecific relations of the genus Antechinus are still under review. The currently accepted phylogeny is the presence of four clades within the Antechinus genus. Generally, the clades are formed by species with similar geographic distributions.

Clade 1 (dusky antechinus)

- A. arktos (black-tailed antechinus)
- A. mimetes (mainland dusky antechinus)
- A. minimus (swamp antechinus)
- A. swainsonii (Tasmanian dusky antechinus)
- A. vandycki (Tasman Peninsula dusky antechinus)

Clade 2

- A. godmani (Atherton antechinus)

Clade 3 (brown antechinus)

- A. agilis (agile antechinus)
- A. stuartii (brown antechinus)
- A. subtropicus (subtropical antechinus)

Clade 4

- A. argentus (silver-headed antechinus)
- A. adustus (rusty antechinus)
- A. bellus (fawn antechinus)
- A. flavipes (yellow-footed antechinus)
- A. leo (cinnamon antechinus)
- A. mysticus (buff-footed antechinus)

== Diet ==
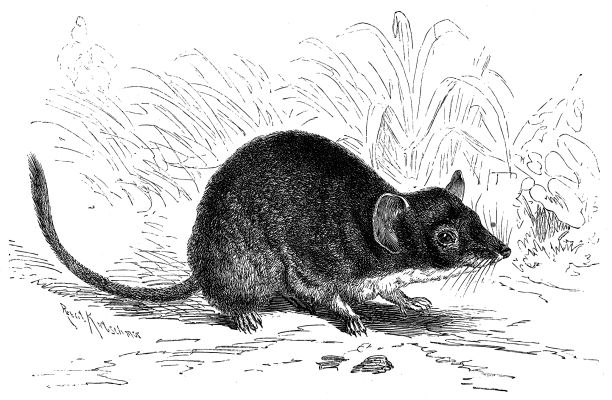
Illustration from Brehms Tierleben, showing an unknown species of Antechinus

Antechinus are mainly insectivorous, but the exact composition of their diet can vary by species and habitat. Antechinus mainly eat beetles, insect larvae and spiders. Amphipods, millipedes and centipedes are also quite common in their diets. It has been found that after a fire, ants make up the majority of their diet—this is thought to be because ants are the only insect present in any number after the fire. It has been reported that Antechinus also eat vertebrates, mainly small reptiles, such as skinks, or mammals, such as feathertail gliders. This is likely to occur most commonly when the Antechinus are food stressed. The remains of plants have been found in Antechinus stool, likely accidentally ingested while searching for other food. Studies on Antechinus diet usually use faecal samples which may be unreliable in detecting soft bodied prey.

Antechinus are usually classified as dietary generalists as they eat a wide variety of invertebrates as well as some vertebrates. They are also classified as opportunists because they feed on most of the prey available to them However, they do show preference for some prey, i.e. beetles, spiders and larvae, especially when they are not food stressed.

The microhabitat and foraging techniques vary between species. Smaller species, such as A. stuartii, are scansorial and mainly hunt in trees. They have been observed jumping between branches to catch flying insects. The larger species of Antechinus, such as A. swainsonii, are completely ground dwelling and forage in the leaf litter.

The efficiency of Antechinus hunting increases with their age as they learn which prey are the best to eat. Antechinus have been observed scraping slugs on rocks and other objects to remove the mucus and make them more palatable.

== Reproduction ==
Antechinus have an extremely unusual reproductive system. The females are synchronously monoestrous with mating occurring over a short three-week period. The males experience mass mortality after mating, with male survival only observed in very rare cases. Females often mate twice or, in some cases, three times during their lives. The gestation period varies by species between 25 and 35 days. The offspring are independent after about 90–100 days, depending on the species. That development period is rather long compared with other, similarly sized marsupials.

=== Timing of the breeding season ===
The timing of the breeding season differs between species and also with the location of populations. The breeding season is in winter or early spring of the Southern Hemisphere, from July to September. The timing of the breeding season changes very little at the same location between different years. The rate of change of photoperiod, the length of daylight, determines the commencement of the breeding season. Different species respond to different critical rates of change, for example 80% of A. stuartii ovulate when the photoperiod is increasing by a rate of 97-117s/day. The critical rate also varies by location within species.

Antechinus live in the relatively stable environments along the east coast of Australia. Responding to the photoperiod, rather than temperature or rainfall, allows Antechinus to have young developing before the seasonal increase of food experienced, rather than waiting for the increase of food and possibly missing the window of opportunity. The timing of mating ensures that the offspring are weaning when there is a large amount of food available in the environment. The timing of the increase in food changes throughout the different ranges of the various species of Antechinus, a reason for different species having different mating seasons.

Many species of Antechinus occur sympatrically. Whenever two or more species of Antechinus occur together, the critical rate of change of photoperiod which triggers ovulation differs between the species. This reproductive isolation may have led to sympatric speciation. There is a possible genetic link that would allow for the selection of specific responses to different rates of change of photoperiod. The slightly different timings of reproduction by these sympatric species may also mean that they can take advantage of different increases of food in the spring and summer. Larger species of Antechinus usually mate first, meaning that the smaller species may have evolved later mating times to reduce competition and capitalise on later increases in food.

A. swainsonii and A. minimums occur in Tasmania and their reliance on the rate of change of the photoperiod for reproduction is less certain. That is because in higher latitudes the photoperiod changes much faster. Animals that mate when the photoperiod is changing by 35-90s/day would only have two or three days in Tasmania, compared with two weeks in New South Wales.

Females control the synchrony of mating, with males reproductively mature and ready to mate four or five weeks before the breeding season. Males have been selected to be ready before the females to ensure the maximum amount of time for mating.

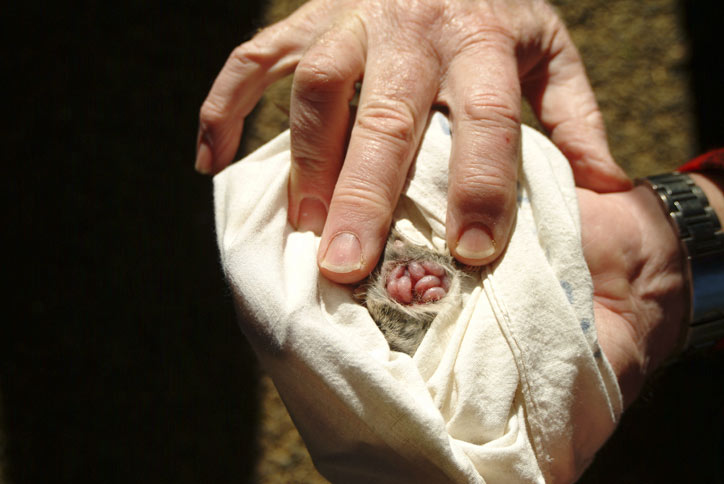
Pouch of agile antechinus (A. agilis), showing offspring inside

=== Reproductive anatomy ===
Antechinus do not have a complete pouch, as in other marsupials, but simply a flap of skin covering the teats. The number of teats in Antechinus species varies between different populations of the same species, and can be anywhere from six to 13. Populations in which females have six teats are found in lower latitudes where the environment is more stable. In higher latitudes, there are populations with eight to 12 nipples. Odd numbers of teats only occur in transition zones and probably occur when populations with a different number of teats mate. The number of nipples is thought to correlate with the number of young that can be supported. In more seasonal environments, where more nipples occur, there is a larger increase in the availability of food for supporting the young. Females with fewer nipples are more likely to survive until the next breeding season. This is thought to be because it is less stressful to raise a smaller litter. The rate of survival of females to reproduce twice differs between species. The larger species, e.g. A. swainsonii are more likely to survive to reproduce for a second time.

=== Mating behaviour ===
Mating is intense for Antechinus and can last up to 12 hours in some species. The males mate with a number of females and the litters have a number of fathers. During the short breeding window, males expand their home range and are often active during night and day.

Males disperse from the nests once they are physiologically independent. Mothers initiate that dispersal but are tolerant of unrelated males in the nest. Inbreeding avoidance is likely to explain that behaviour.

=== Male semelparity ===
Male die-off occurs because of an increase in free corticosteroids in the blood, which causes a suppression of the immune system and internal hemorrhaging and which result in male mortality. An increase in free corticosteroids is thought to allow males to utilise their reserve energy and maximise their reproductive effort, even though the increase usually proves fatal. If there were no male die-off, there would still only be a small likelihood of males surviving to the next mating period. Thus, it is far better for the males to invest heavily in one breeding season than attempt to survive to the next one.

There are a few possible evolutionary advantages to the evolution of synchronous mating. It may ensure that as many matings as possible occur during the mating period. It also ensures that males can focus all their effort into one short breeding season. Another possible advantage of synchronous mating is to overwhelm predators with large numbers of offspring after weaning.

== Torpor ==
Torpor is periodic lowering of body temperature and metabolic rate to reduce energy consumption. Many marsupials undergo torpor as well as some birds and placental mammals. There are two types of torpor: hibernation which is long term (weeks or months) and daily torpor which is usually only a few hours. Daily torpor involves a less extreme lowering of body temperature and metabolic rate than hibernation. Antechinus undergo daily torpor.

Unlike hibernation, daily torpor is not simply reliant on ambient air temperatures. Antechinus can move into torpor on summer days with temperatures in the range of 25–30 °C (77–86 °F). This is called spontaneous torpor. Induced torpor occurs when food and water are restricted – this is most easily observed in a laboratory environment as restriction of food in the wild is hard to determine. Torpor of Antechinus in the wild is likely to be the result of a combination of factors.

Antechinus are small mammals and thus have a high surface/volume ratio which results in high heat loss. They also have a high metabolic rate and normothermic temperatures of around 35 °C (95 °F). Going into torpor allows them to greatly reduce metabolic rates, sometimes up to 80% This reduces both the food and water requirements of the animal.

Torpor in Antechinus usually occurs during rest periods, either in the early morning after nightly foraging or the late afternoon before nightly foraging. However, going into torpor during the night is not uncommon. Torpor allows the animals to conserve energy while they are not foraging. The substantial savings in water requirements during torpor may also help Antechinus cope with droughts.

Body mass is an important factor for the induction of torpor, with larger animals less likely to go into torpor and more likely to stay in torpor for shorter periods of time. This means that males go into torpor less frequently than females. Lactating females do not go into torpor. Torpor in Antechinus can last for one to nine hours and in extreme cases nearly 20 hours. The body temperatures of these animals drops significantly. In female A. flavipes the minimum body temperature during torpor can be around 20 °C (68 °F). In males it is higher, around 30 °C (86 °F). Smaller animals have a lower body temperature during torpor.

An increase in the induction of torpor in Antechinus has been found to occur after intense bushfires. Intense bushfires destroy the dense undergrowth that provide Antechinus with shelter and food. After intense bush fires Antechinus were recorded as eating mainly ants, which usually form a very small part of their diet. Increasing the occurrences of torpor, in both males and females, is thought to help with survival after an intense bushfire by reducing the need for foraging and thus avoiding predators. It has been shown that smoke, ash and charcoal provide a cue for torpor induction.

Increasing body temperature after torpor is energetically costly and reduces some of the metabolic savings. However, animals have been observed basking to help increase their body temperature without increasing their food intake.

Females that have survived to a second year go into torpor much more frequently than females that are in their first year, even though second-year females are larger. It is thought that this is because first-year females are still growing and thus need more food which requires more time spent foraging. Older females are also more experienced at foraging and may meet their energy requirements more efficiently.

== Threats ==
A. arktos and A. argentus are currently listed as endangered. The main threats to those species, indeed all species of Antechinus, are habitat destruction and introduced animals.

Deforestation and habitat destruction removes the complex understorey habitat which Antechinus require for protection from predators and for food. Antechinus also nest in tree hollows, which only form in senescent trees.

Introduced predators, especially foxes and cats, threaten Antechinus populations by predating on them. There is also competition between Antechinus and introduced rats and mice for habitat and food, which may be detrimental to Antechinus numbers. Pigs, cattle and horses trample Antechinus habitats.

Changed fire regimes since European colonisation have resulted in more intense bushfires, which can adversely affect Antechinus populations by destroying understorey vegetation and removing their preferred food.

Climate change threatens several high altitude species, especially those in northern Queensland.
