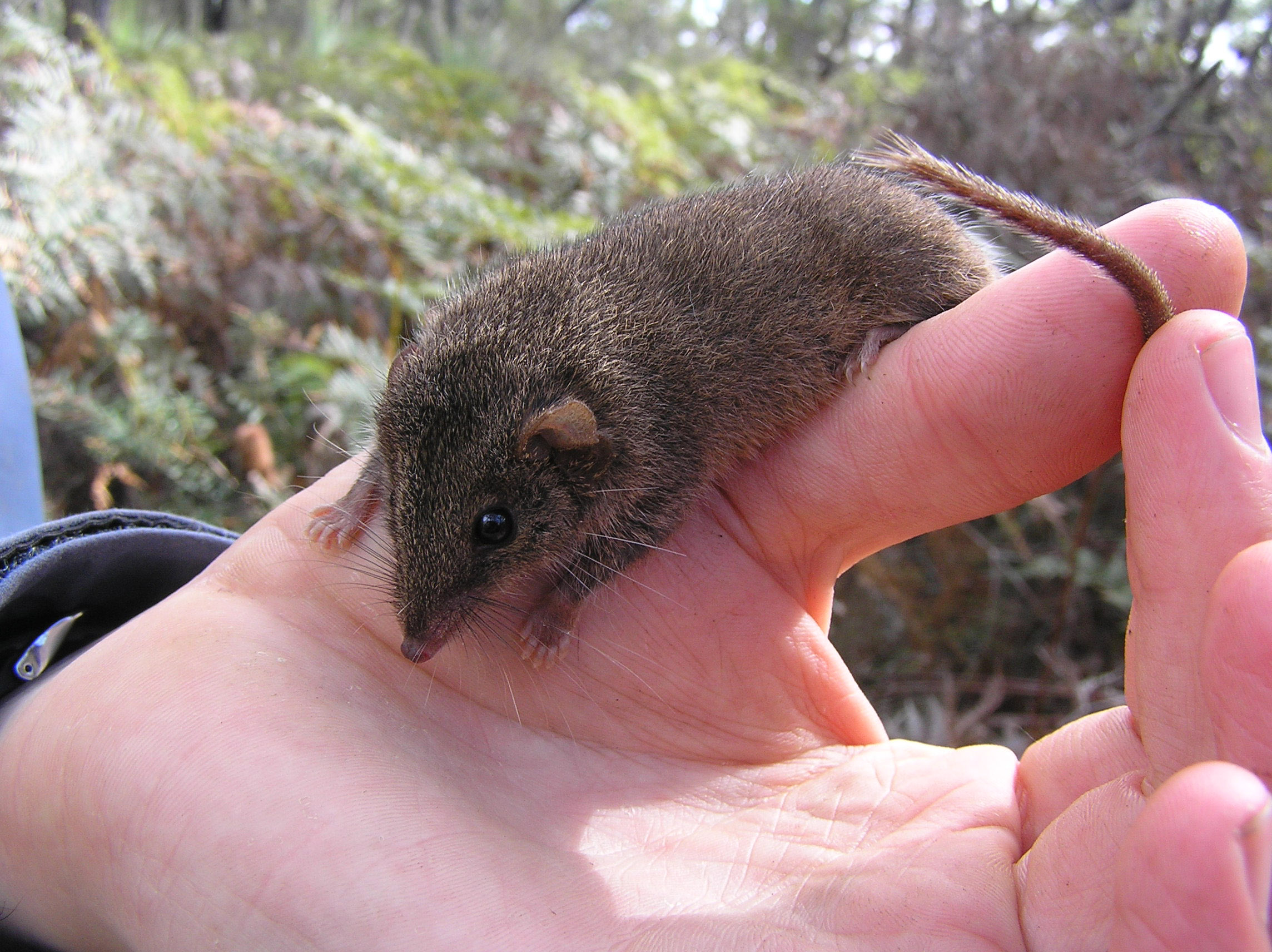

Conservation status
- Least Concern (IUCN 3.1)

Scientific classification
- Kingdom: Animalia
- Phylum: Chordata
- Class: Mammalia
- Infraclass: Marsupialia
- Order: Dasyuromorphia
- Family: Dasyuridae
- Genus: Antechinus
- Species: A. agilis

Binomial name
- Antechinus agilis Dickman, Parnaby, Crowther & King 1998
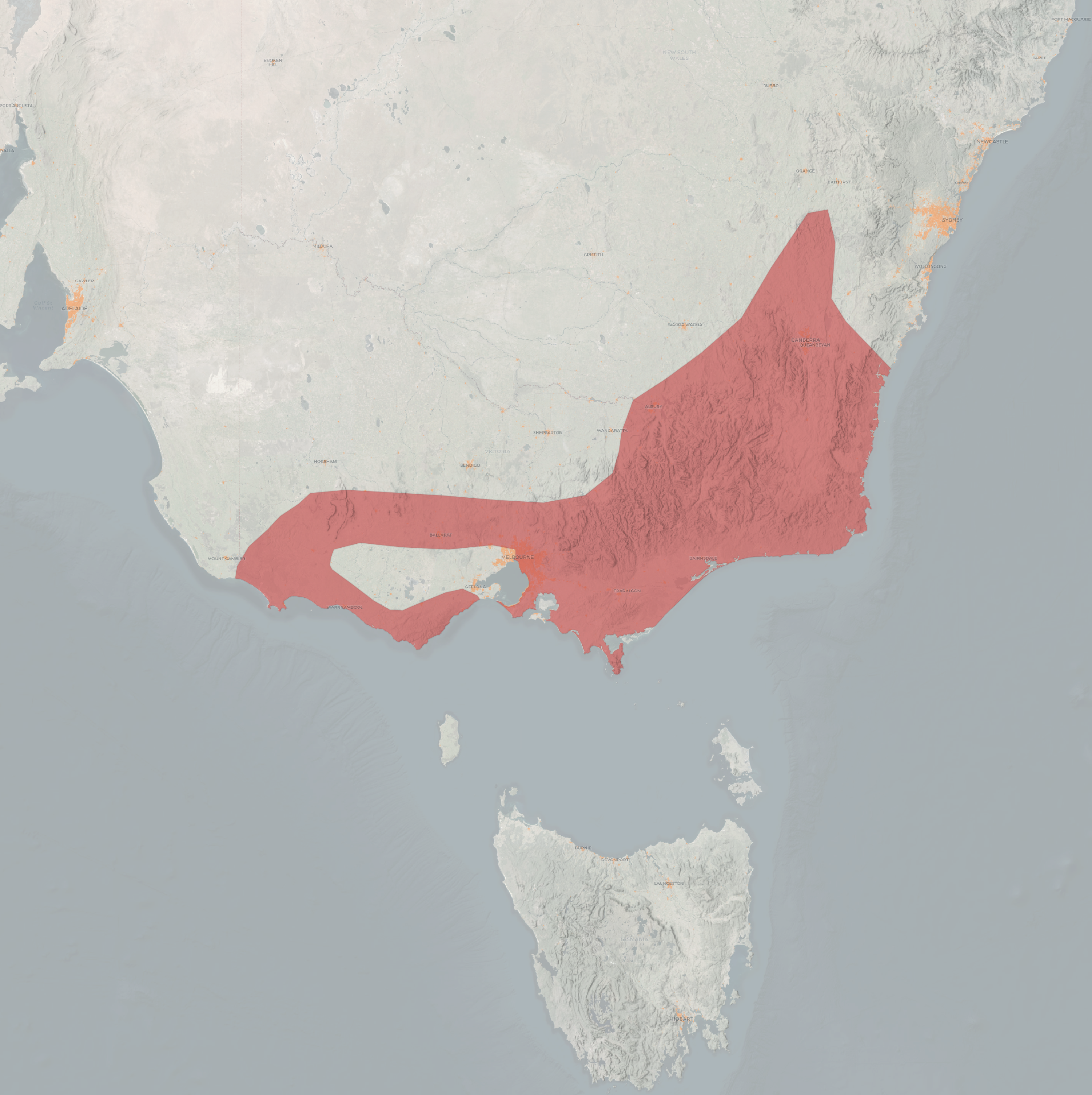
- Agile antechinus range

= Agile antechinus =

Species of marsupial

The agile antechinus (Antechinus agilis) is a species of small carnivorous marsupial of the family Dasyuridae. It is found in Australia.

== Taxonomy ==
The agile antechinus was long considered to be a form of the brown antechinus (Antechinus stuartii), and was only recognised as a distinct species after a study of genetic variation within the brown antechinus in 1980. However, it was not formally described until 1998.

== Characteristics ==
The agile antechinus is nearly indistinguishable from the brown antechinus, but it is slightly smaller and its fur has a more greyish tinge. It feeds mostly on invertebrates, including beetles, spiders and cockroaches, but may also devour small lizards and soft berries. The species has been known to enter torpor in response to shortages of food. Like all antechinuses, the agile antechinus has a short and violent breeding season, after which the males all die. The females give birth after a 27-day gestation. Groups of up to 20 have been known to nest together.

== Distribution and habitat ==
The agile antechinus inhabits wet or moist forest in the southeastern corner of Australia. The species is widely abundant, although it has been reduced in areas due to forest clearing, the instigation of plantations, harvesting, controlled burning and the introduction of the cat and the red fox. Despite these threats, there is no indication that the species is at all threatened.

== Gallery ==
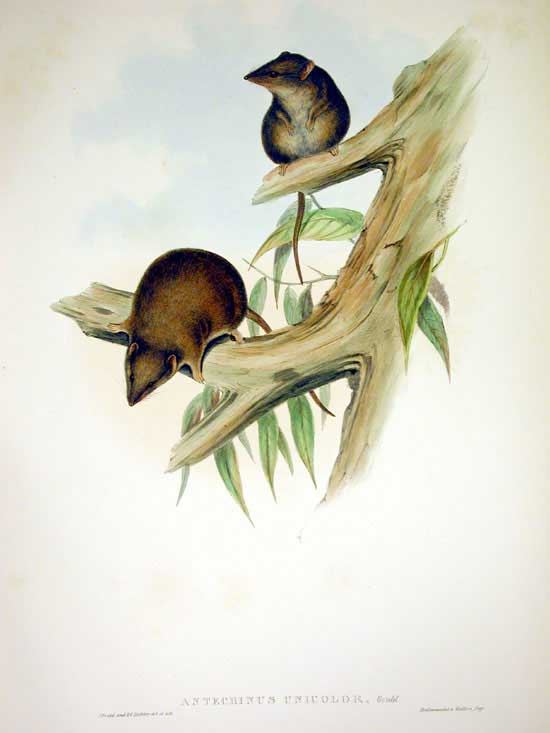
From John Gould's Mammals of Australia

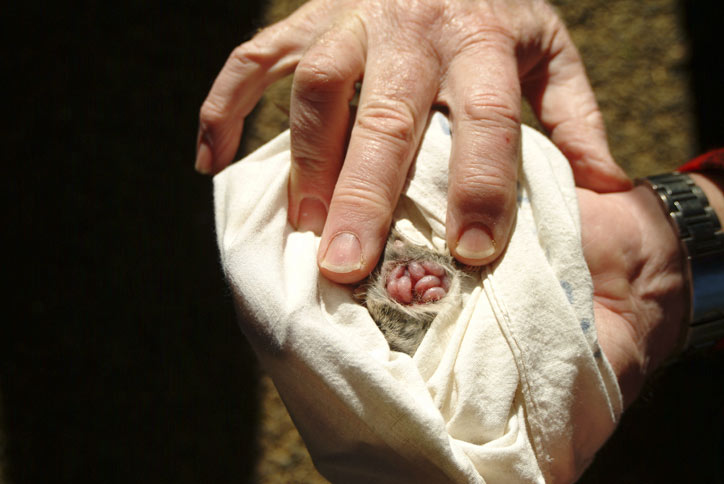
Female with offspring inside

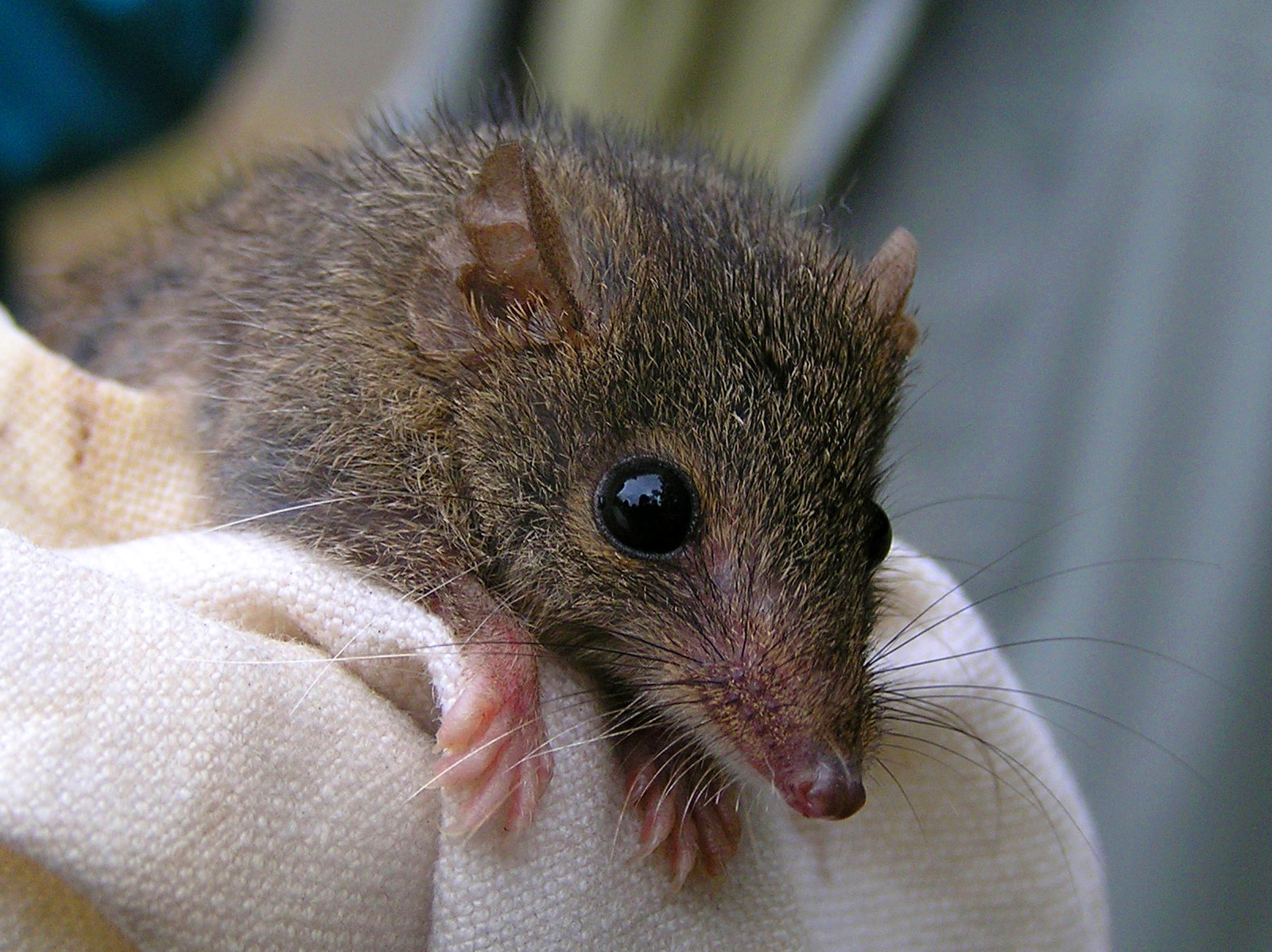
Close-up
