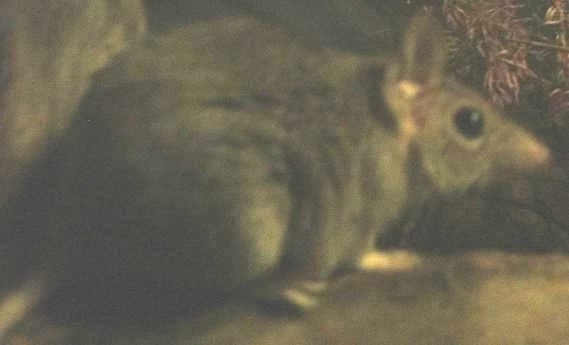

Conservation status
- Vulnerable (IUCN 3.1)

Scientific classification
- Kingdom: Animalia
- Phylum: Chordata
- Class: Mammalia
- Infraclass: Marsupialia
- Order: Dasyuromorphia
- Family: Dasyuridae
- Genus: Antechinus
- Species: A. bellus

Binomial name
- Antechinus bellus (Thomas, 1904)
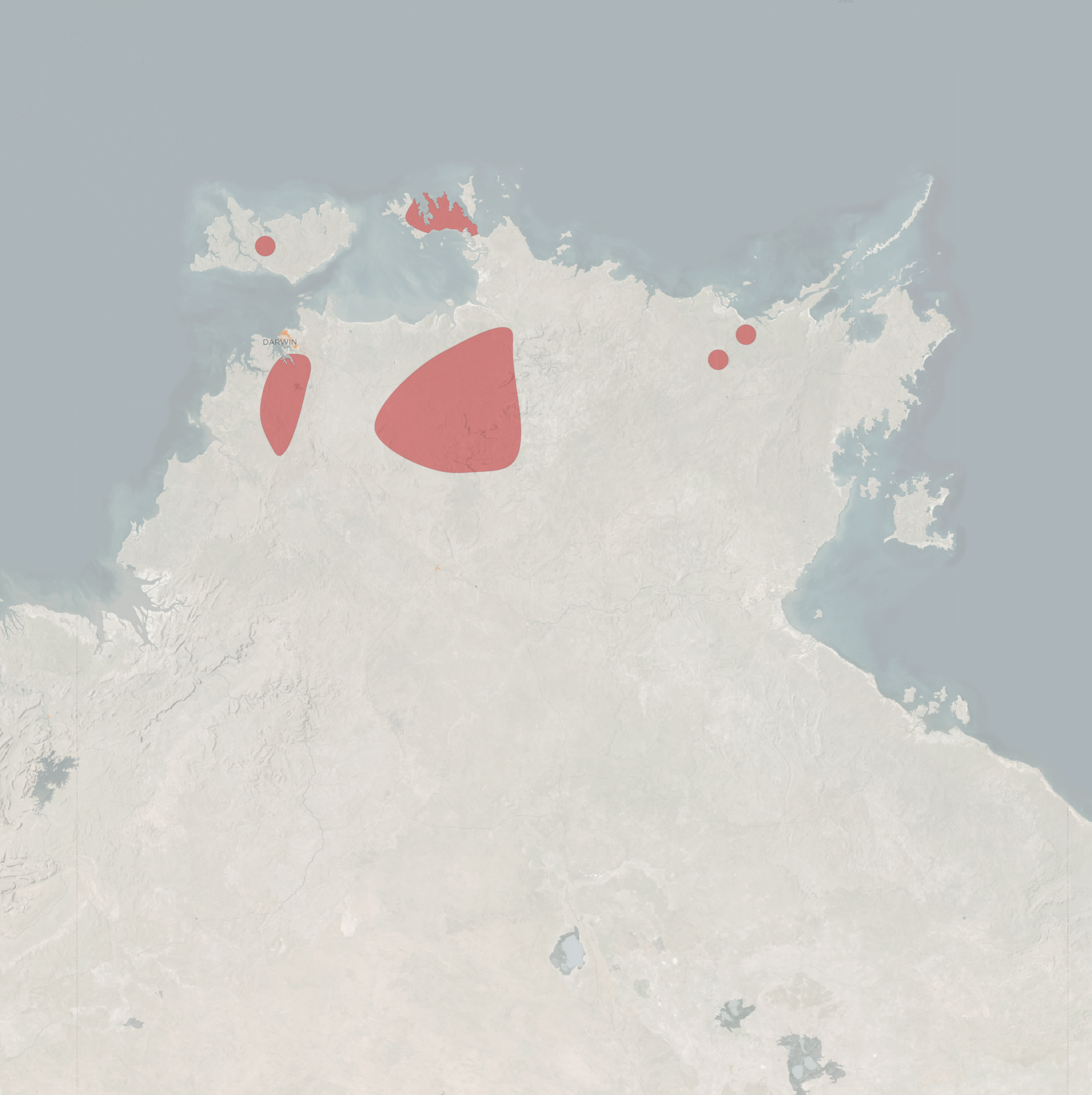
- Distribution of the fawn antechinus

= Fawn antechinus =

Species of marsupial

The fawn antechinus (Antechinus bellus) is a species of small carnivorous marsupial found in northern Australia. It is the only Antechinus to be found in the Northern Territory and has a patchy, restricted range.

== Taxonomy ==
The earliest scientific collection of a fawn antechinus was made by John T. Tunney, and the first zoological description was made in 1904 by the renowned biologist Oldfield Thomas, who gave it the species name bellus, meaning beautiful. It has never been confused with other species.

It is a member of the family Dasyuridae and of the genus Antechinus (meaning "hedgehog-equivalent"), which has nine other members.

== Description ==
The fawn antechinus is unique among antechinuses, being considerably paler than many of its relatives. It is a light grey colour and is distinguished from the only other similar species in the area where it lives (the sandstone dibbler and the red-cheeked dunnart) by its larger size and paler colouring. It is insectivorous and, like many of its relatives, all of the males die after the breeding season.

The fawn antechinus has a breeding season during August. Young are born in September–October in litters of up to ten, and are usually weaned by January.

== Distribution and habitat ==
The fawn antechinus is found in the Top End of the Northern Territory, where it was once fairly common. It inhabits tall, fairly open forest in the tropics. Populations have declined substantially since European colonisation, with one study in the Northern Territory finding a 20% reduction in the extent of occurrence of and a 45% reduction in the breadth of occupied environmental space.

== In Aboriginal language and culture ==
The Kunwinjku people of western Arnhem Land call this animal mulbbu, as they do many small marsupials and rodents.
