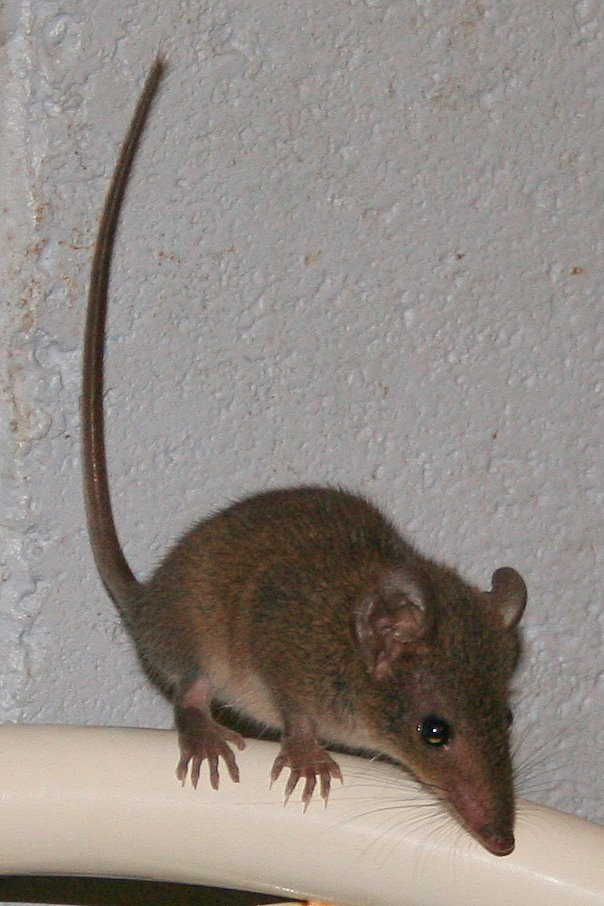

Conservation status
- Least Concern (IUCN 3.1)

Scientific classification
- Kingdom: Animalia
- Phylum: Chordata
- Class: Mammalia
- Infraclass: Marsupialia
- Order: Dasyuromorphia
- Family: Dasyuridae
- Genus: Antechinus
- Species: A. stuartii

Binomial name
- Antechinus stuartii Macleay, 1841
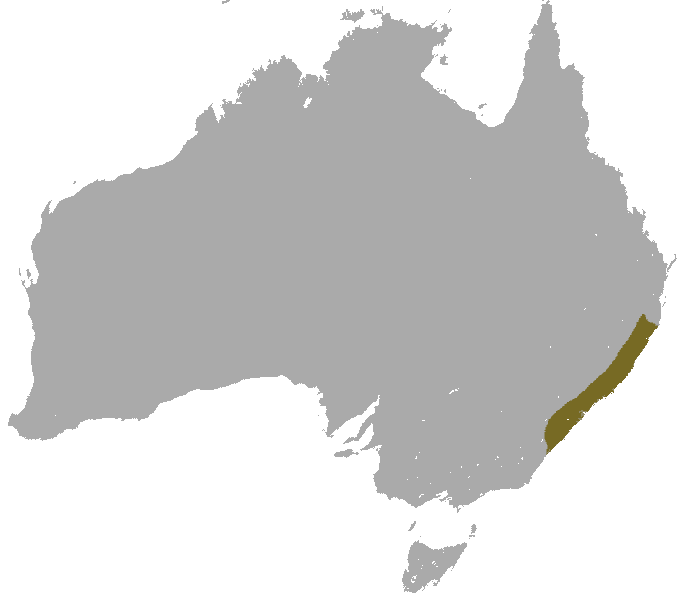
- Brown antechinus range

= Brown antechinus =

Species of mammal

The brown antechinus (Antechinus stuartii), also known as Stuart's antechinus and Macleay's marsupial mouse, is a species of small carnivorous marsupial of the family Dasyuridae. The males die after their first breeding season, and the species holds the world record for being the world's smallest semelparous mammal.

== Description ==
Antechinus stuartii is mostly light brown above, including the upper surfaces of its feet, and a lighter brown below and on its tail. Its body length is 93–130 mm (3.7–5.1 in) and its tail 92–120 mm (3.6–4.7 in), and it weighs 16–44 g (0.56–1.55 oz). Unlike in other members of Antechinus, no pale-coloured eye ring occurs. Antechinus agilis is similar in appearance and difficult to distinguish except by its distribution.

== Taxonomy ==
The brown antechinus was only the third in its genus to be described and as such, until recently, has included species such as the agile antechinus (Antechinus agilis), the subtropical antechinus (Antechinus subtropicus), and the tropical antechinus (Antechinus adustus). It has also been included itself with the yellow-footed antechinus as the subspecies A. flavipes burrelli. It was described in 1841 by the entomologist William Sharp Macleay, who named the species in honour of his friend and fellow naturalist James Stuart, who had discovered the animal at Spring Cove (North Head) in 1837 while working as surgeon in charge of the Quarantine Station.

== Behavior ==
The brown antechinus is mostly nocturnal and is arboreal, and females build large communal nests shared by many individuals. Like all antechinuses, the males die after their first breeding season (which lasts two weeks) as a result of stress and exhaustion. The current accepted hypothesis to why this happens is that sperm competition drives increased male investment in reproduction. Female brown antechinuses do not possess a pouch; the young must attach themselves to the teats (of which there are usually eight). The litter size is six or seven young.

Its diet includes beetles, spiders, amphipods, and cockroaches, although it is an opportunistic feeder. Following a fire it will remain in its home range and undergo torpor, thus reducing its foraging requirements and reducing the risk from predators.

== Distribution and habitat ==
The brown antechinus is found east of the Great Dividing Range in Australia, from southeastern Queensland to around Kioloa, New South Wales. It is mostly found in forested habitats, with dense lower ground cover and low fire frequency.
