= Atherton antechinus =

Conservation status
- Least Concern (IUCN 3.1)

Scientific classification
- Kingdom: Animalia
- Phylum: Chordata
- Class: Mammalia
- Infraclass: Marsupialia
- Order: Dasyuromorphia
- Family: Dasyuridae
- Genus: Antechinus
- Species: A. godmani

Binomial name
- Antechinus godmani (Thomas, 1923)
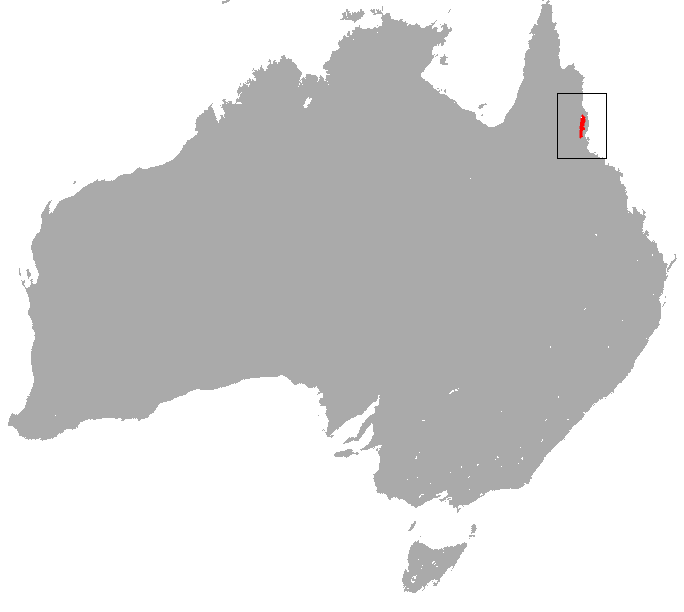
- Atherton antechinus range

Species of marsupial

The Atherton antechinus (Antechinus godmani), also known as Godman's antechinus, is a species of small carnivorous, insectivorous marsupial native to Australia. It is one of the rarest members of its genus, and differs from other antechinuses in its more rufous body colour and small eyes.

== Taxonomy ==
The Atherton antechinus was first described in 1923 by Oldfield Thomas. For many years, it was regarded as a subspecies of the yellow-footed antechinus (A. flavipes). A member of the dasyurid family, the Atherton antechinus is a member of the genus Antechinus, of which it is one of the most restricted members.

== Description ==
The Atherton antechinus is a dull brown colour, and is among the largest of the antechinuses. The species has an almost naked tail.

The Atherton antechinus is believed to be mostly nocturnal or crepuscular, at which times it emerges to feed, mostly on terrestrial invertebrates. The mating season is July–August, after which all of the males subsequently die.

== Distribution and habitat ==
The Atherton antechinus is restricted to a 130 km region of rainforest between Mount Bellenden Ker and Cardwell, in northeastern Queensland. It builds nests in tree hollows or leaf litter of epiphytes.
