= Climbing mouse =

Climbing mouse may refer to members of the following genera of rodents:

- Dendromus, from Africa;
- Dendroprionomys (Velvet African Climbing Mouse), from the Republic of the Congo;
- Irenomys (Chilean Climbing Mouse), from southwestern South America;
- Rhipidomys, from South America;
- Vandeleuria, from southern and southeastern Asia;
- Vernaya (Vernay's Climbing Mouse), from southern China and northern Myanmar.
