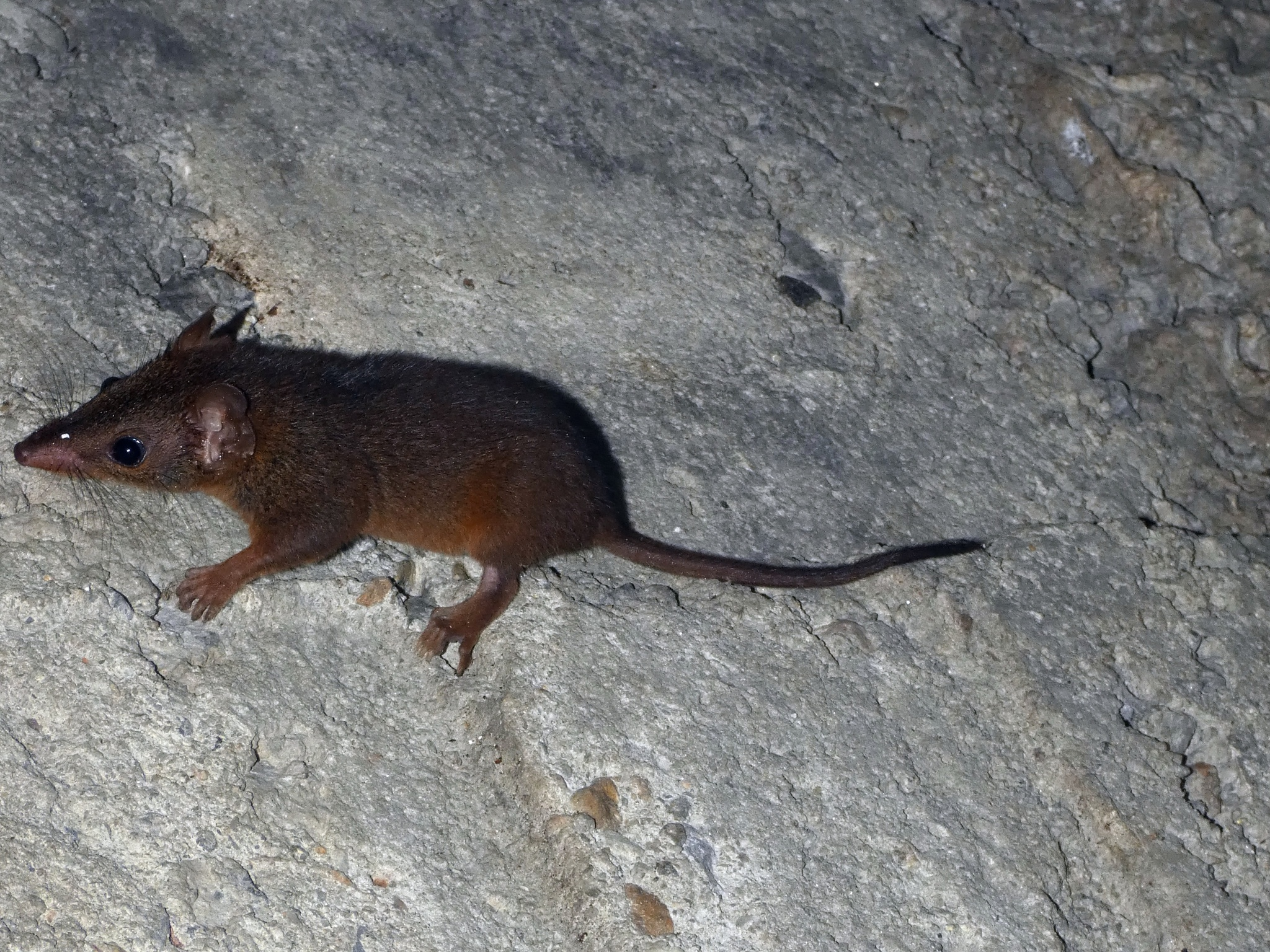
- Rusty Antechinus (Antechinus adustus) in Australia

Conservation status
- Least Concern (IUCN 3.1)

Scientific classification
- Kingdom: Animalia
- Phylum: Chordata
- Class: Mammalia
- Infraclass: Marsupialia
- Order: Dasyuromorphia
- Family: Dasyuridae
- Genus: Antechinus
- Species: A. adustus

Binomial name
- Antechinus adustus (Thomas, 1923)
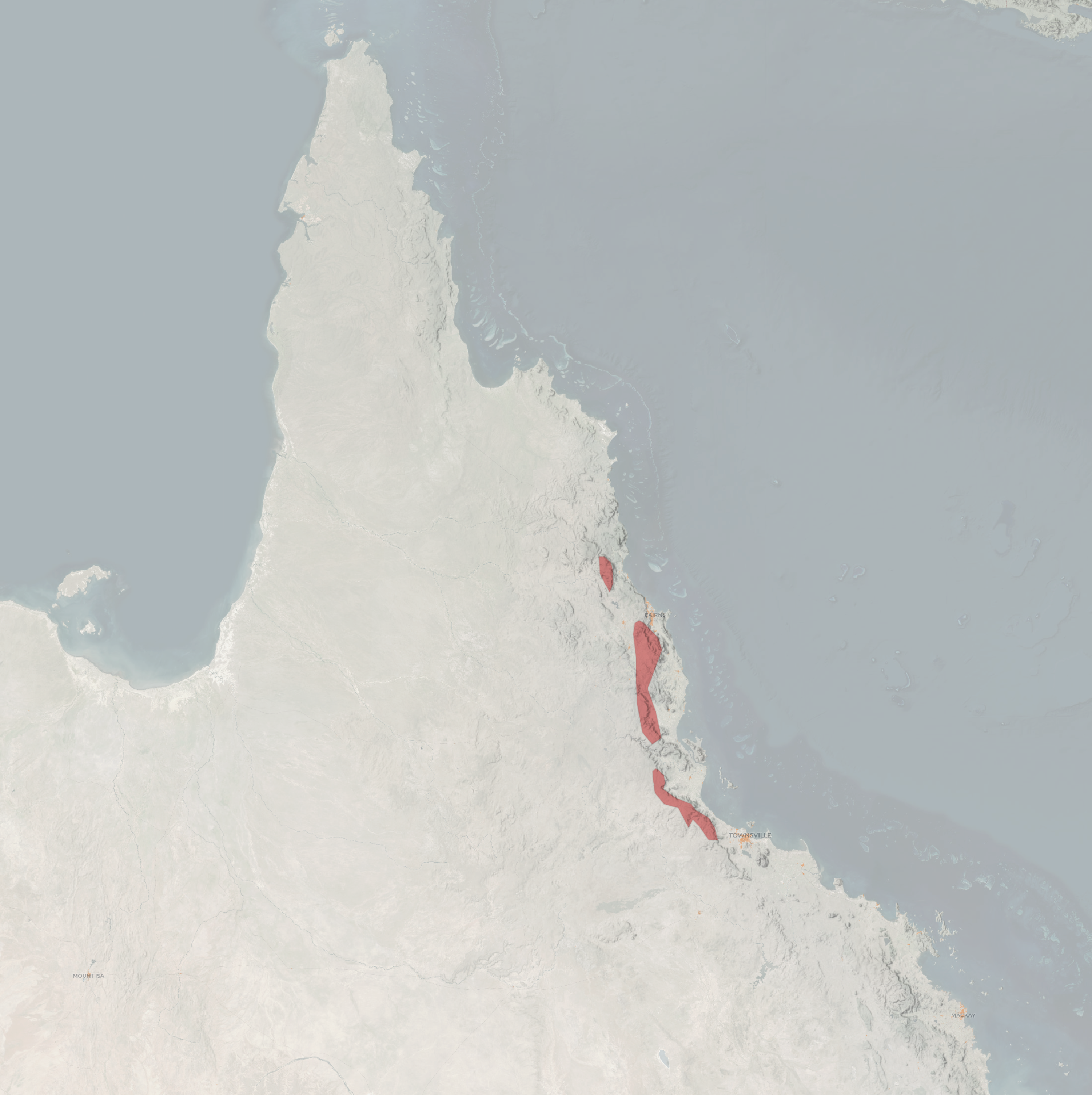
- Distribution of the tropical antechinus

= Tropical antechinus =

Species of marsupial

The tropical antechinus (Antechinus adustus), also known as the rusty antechinus, is a species of small marsupial carnivore, particularly closely related to the brown antechinus (Antechinus stuartii).

It is found in a small area of tropical vine forest from Paluma (near Townsville) to Mount Spurgeon (near Mossman) in northeastern Queensland, Australia. It differs from the brown antechinus, with which it was previously thought to be conspecific, in its longer and darker fur. It shares the unusual mating behaviour of many of its relatives in that shortly after the breeding season all males die from stress-related disease.
