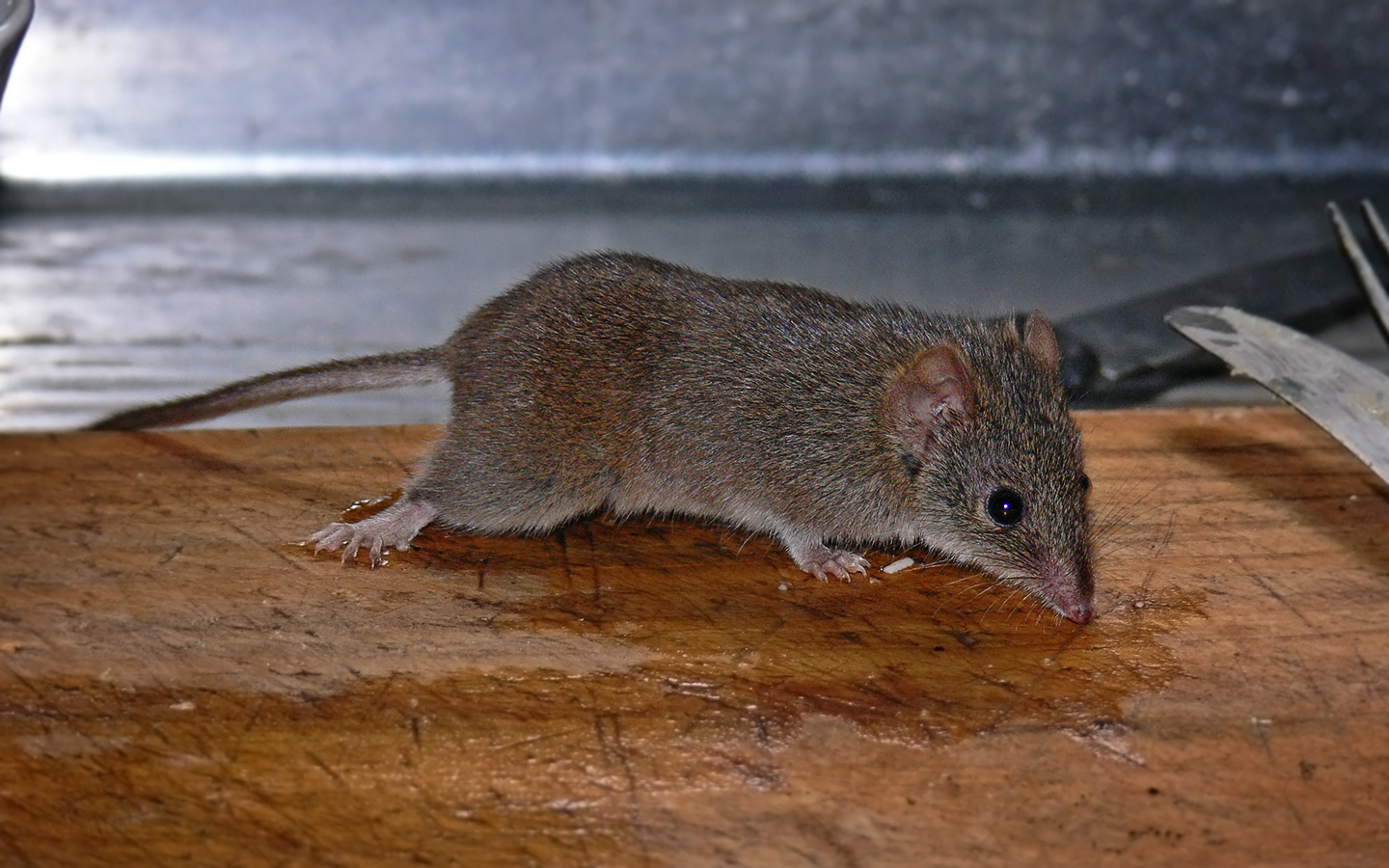

Conservation status
- Least Concern (IUCN 3.1)

Scientific classification
- Kingdom: Animalia
- Phylum: Chordata
- Class: Mammalia
- Infraclass: Marsupialia
- Order: Dasyuromorphia
- Family: Dasyuridae
- Genus: Antechinus
- Species: A. flavipes

Binomial name
- Antechinus flavipes (Waterhouse, 1838)

Subspecies
- Antechinus flavipes flavipes; Antechinus flavipes leucogaster; Antechinus flavipes rubeculus
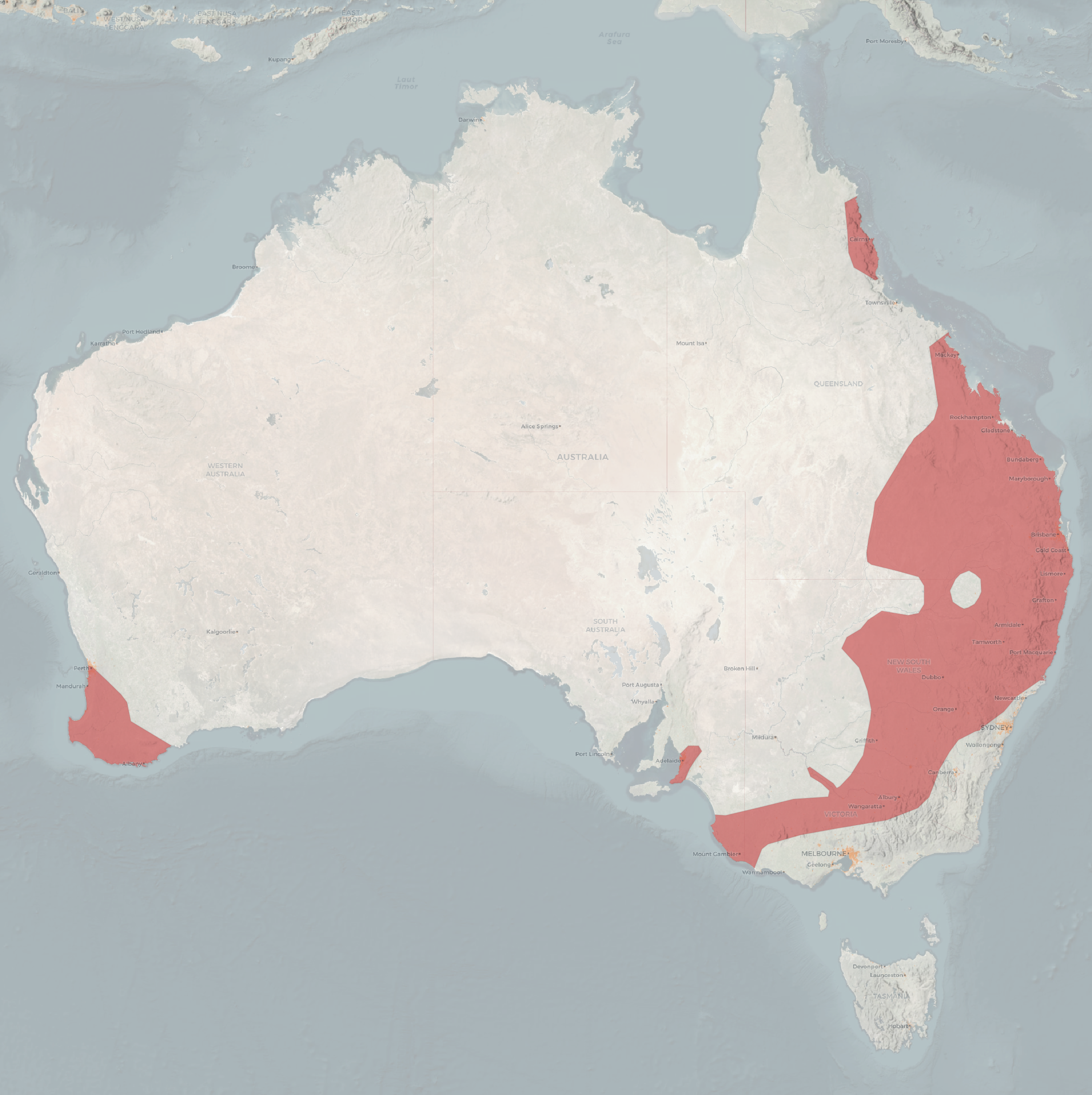
- Distribution of the yellow-footed antechinus

= Yellow-footed antechinus =

Species of marsupial

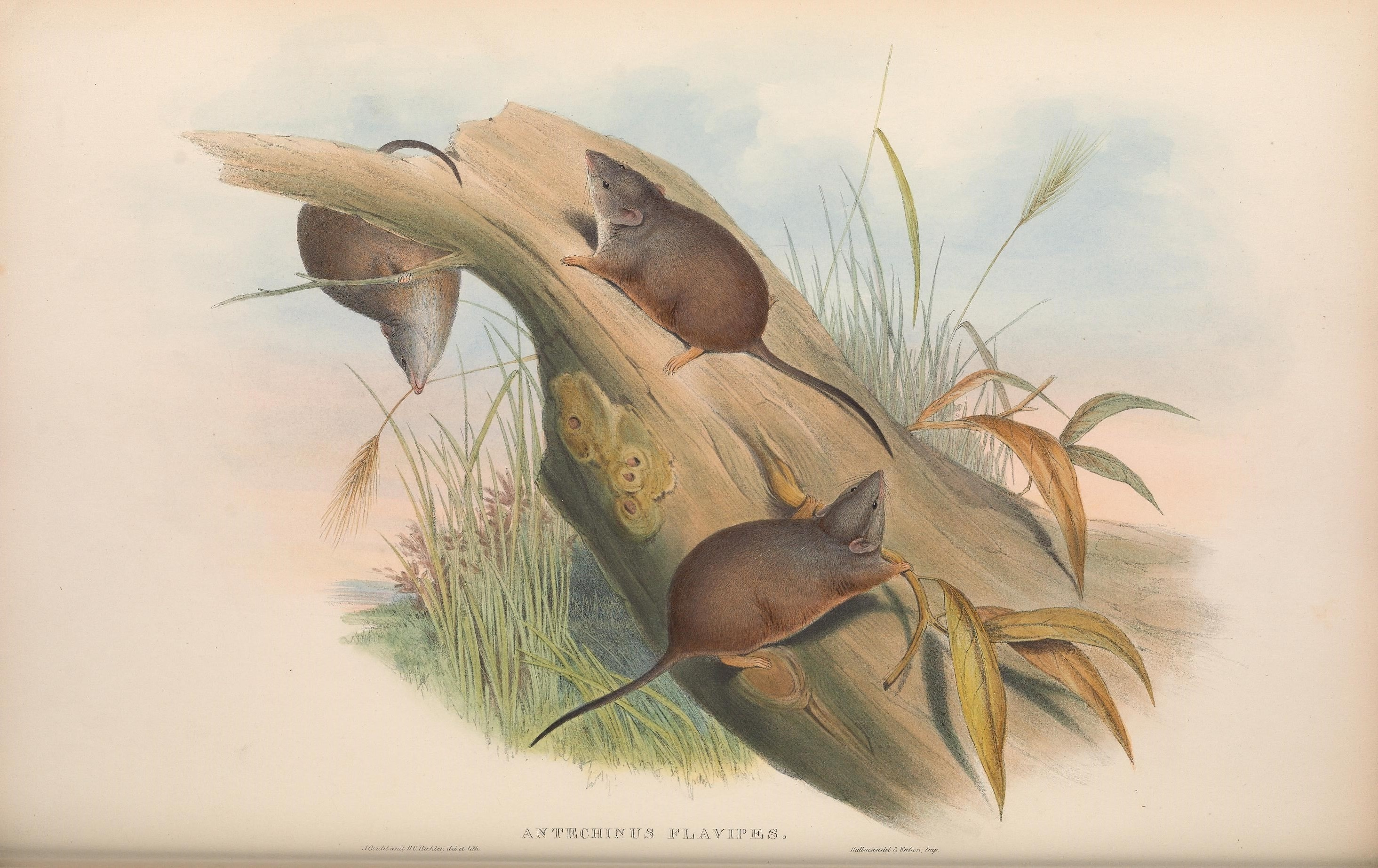
Antechinus flavipes (yellow-footed antechinus)

The yellow-footed antechinus (Antechinus flavipes), also known as the mardo, is a shrew-like marsupial found in Australia. One notable feature of the species is its sexual behavior. The male yellow-footed antechinus engages in such frenzied mating that its immune system becomes compromised, resulting in stress-related death before it is one year old.

== Taxonomy ==
The yellow-footed antechinus was described in 1838 by George Robert Waterhouse, referring to a specimen that was collected north of the Hunter River in New South Wales. The author tentatively placed the new species with the genus Phascogale, based on similar dentition by reference to a description but without a skull for a closer comparison. The specific epithet flavipes means "yellow-footed." The species has occasionally been combined with the Antechinus stuartii (brown antechinus).

A member of the family Dasyuridae, the yellow-footed antechinus is the most widespread of all the members of its genus, Antechinus.

Three subspecies of the yellow-footed antechinus are recognised:

- Antechinus flavipes flavipes Waterhouse 1838, found in southeastern Queensland, New South Wales, Victoria and South Australia
- Antechinus flavipes leucogaster, found in southwestern Western Australia
- Antechinus flavipes rubeculus, found in northeastern Queensland

== Description ==
The yellow-footed antechinus has a geographically variable fur colour, but is generally somewhat greyish. Other notable features include a white eye-ring and a black tip to the tail. The coloration is always slate grey at the head and shoulder, with a grizzled appearance that grades to russet or yellowish fur, pale at the chin and throat and a darker tone at the rump, flank, belly, leg and foot. This variation in the subspecies A. flavipes rubeculus, those occurring in the northeast of Queensland, is a deep red than the population in southwest Australia, A. flavipes leucogaster.

In size and body shape this species is fairly typical of Antechinus genus. The combined head and body length is from 90 to 160 millimetres (3.5 to 6.3 in) and weight range is 20 to 75 grams (0.71 to 2.65 oz). The number of teats varies between individuals and the subspecies, flavipes has 10 to 13 and leucogaster 8 to 10 teats. It has a pointed muzzle and short, broad feet of buff to yellow-brown colour, hence the name. It has short hair and a moderately long tail.

The yellow-footed antechinus differs from its relatives in its comparatively diurnal habits. The mating season lasts for two weeks either in August, for southern animals; in October, for animals from southern Queensland; or in June–July, for north Queensland animals. The diet is invertebrates, eggs, nectar and sometimes small vertebrates.

== Distribution and habitat ==
The yellow-footed antechinus is found discontinuously from around the Mount Lofty Ranges in South Australia to around Eungella in Queensland, with the exception of most of coastal New South Wales and Victoria. Isolated populations occur in northeastern Queensland and in southwestern Western Australia. Some populations are listed as "locally common", others as uncertain.

The yellow-footed antechinus occupies a variety of habitats, including dry arid scrubland and sclerophyll forest. In the north, it also inhabits coastal heaths, swamps and woodland; in the far north it is found in tropical vine forest.

== Reproduction ==
Antechinus are both polyandrous and semelparous; all males die after the mating period and most females die after weaning their offspring, while some females live to the next year to litter another brood. Female A. flavipes vary their torpor use over the course of gestation (~28 days) and in response to adverse environmental conditions, likely to promote the healthy development of their young. Prior to breeding, both males and females use frequent, deep, and long torpor which is reduced during the mating season. Pregnant females continue to use torpor, but these are significantly shallower and less frequent than they were before breeding. Parturient and lactating females do not express torpor. Body temperature and metabolic rate are tightly controlled during these times and can be matched to the reproductive stage of the female.
