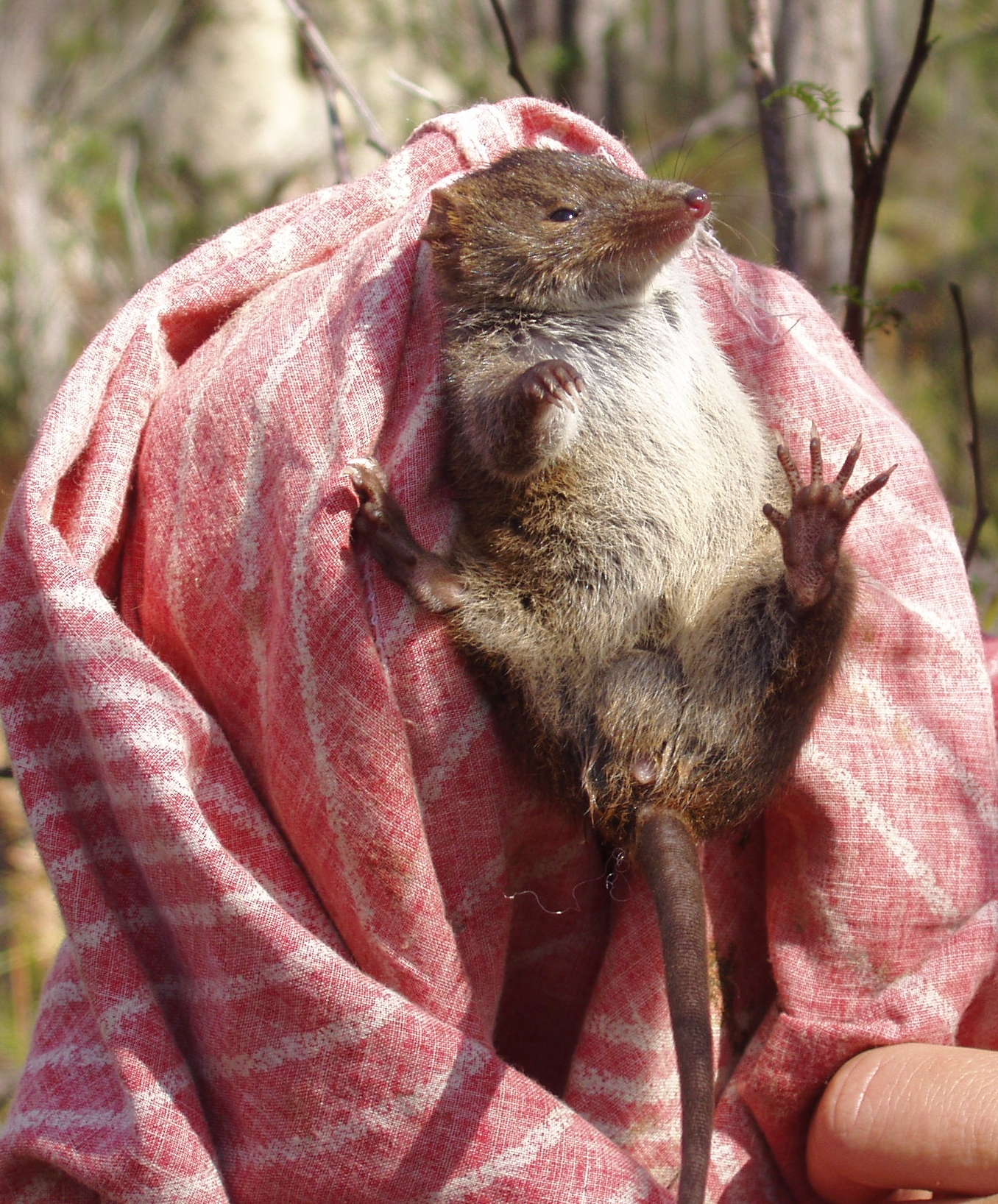
- Male dusky antechinus

Conservation status
- Least Concern (IUCN 3.1)

Scientific classification
- Kingdom: Animalia
- Phylum: Chordata
- Class: Mammalia
- Infraclass: Marsupialia
- Order: Dasyuromorphia
- Family: Dasyuridae
- Genus: Antechinus
- Species: A. swainsonii

Binomial name
- Antechinus swainsonii (Waterhouse, 1840)
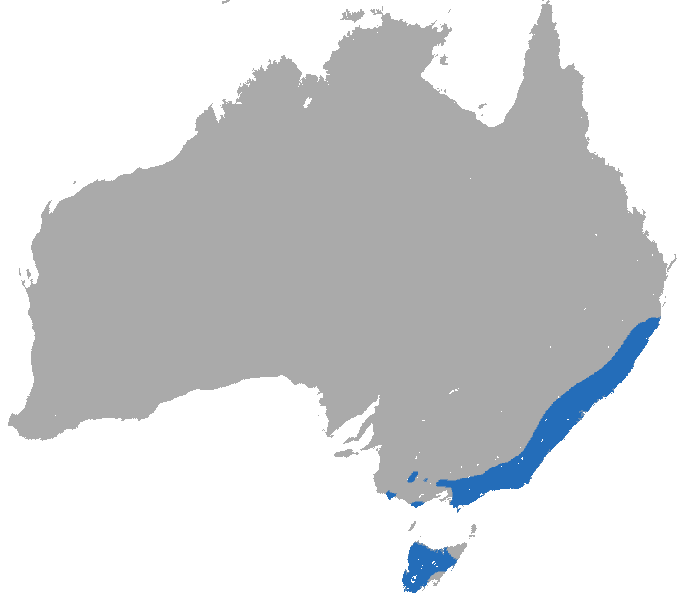
- Dusky antechinus range

= Dusky antechinus =

Species of marsupial

The dusky antechinus (Antechinus swainsonii), also known as Swainson's antechinus or the dusky marsupial mouse, is a species of small marsupial carnivore, a member of the family Dasyuridae. It is found in Australia.

== Taxonomy ==
The dusky antechinus was described by English naturalist George Robert Waterhouse in 1840, the second antechinus to be described. It was named in honour of the zoologist and artist William Swainson, with the holotype likely being a specimen collected by Swainson's correspondent Thomas Lempriere from the Tasman Peninsula in Tasmania.

There are three subspecies:

- A. s. swainsonii, found in Tasmania;
- A. s. insulanus, found in the Grampians National Park, Victoria;
- A. s. mimetes, found from south-eastern Queensland through eastern New South Wales to south-western Victoria.

== Description ==
The dusky antechinus is the largest antechinus. The largest and darkest fur Dusky Antechinus occur in higher altitudes. It can be distinguished from its relatives by its much darker fur, which is also apparent in the pale form. It is mostly nocturnal but has suggested to be partly active during the day. It mostly eats invertebrates, although it will occasionally devour small lizards and skinks. Like all antechinuses, the dusky antechinus has a short and vigorous mating season (which occurs during winter), after which nearly all of the males die. However, compared to the other antechinus species whose male individuals are almost invariably semelparous and females usually so, iteroparity is more commonly seen in the present species (perhaps due to its comparatively large size). The dusky antechinus is also known for being unusually vocal for an antechinus, and has been observed hissing and chattering.

== Distribution and habitat ==
The dusky antechinus is found from southeastern Queensland to southwestern Victoria in Australia, and is also found in Tasmania. It is most common in mountainous regions, including Kosciuszko National Park and the Brindabella Ranges, where they are found in alpine heath or tall open forest with a dense understorey. The species is not threatened, but local populations have been reduced by controlled burning and the instigation of pine plantations in the place of native forests. The cat and the red fox are also believed to be detrimental to local populations.
