= Steve Van Dyck =

Steve Van Dyck is the Senior Curator of vertebrates at Queensland Museum, in Brisbane, Queensland, Australia.

Steve Van Dyck was instrumental in the rediscovery of the endangered mahogany glider in 1989.

== Honour ==
Steve Van Dyck has been awarded the 2008 Queensland Museum Medal for Research.

Van Dyck was awarded the medal for his considerable talent in discovering a number of new species and also for behavioural studies of Australian mammals.

The medal was presented to Dr Steve Van Dyck by the Queensland Arts Minister Rod Welford in February, 2008.

== Professional publications ==
Steve Van Dyck's professional publications include:

- Van Dyck, S. (1993). The taxonomy and distribution of Petaurus gracilis (Marsupialia: Petauridae), with notes on its ecology and distribution status, Mem. Queensland Museum 33: 77-122
- Van Dyck, S. (1995). Mahogany Glider Petaurus gracilis. pp. 232–233 in Strahan, R. (ed.) The Mammals of Australia. The National Photographic Index of Australian Wildlife. Sydney: Reed New Holland 2nd Edition 756 pp.
