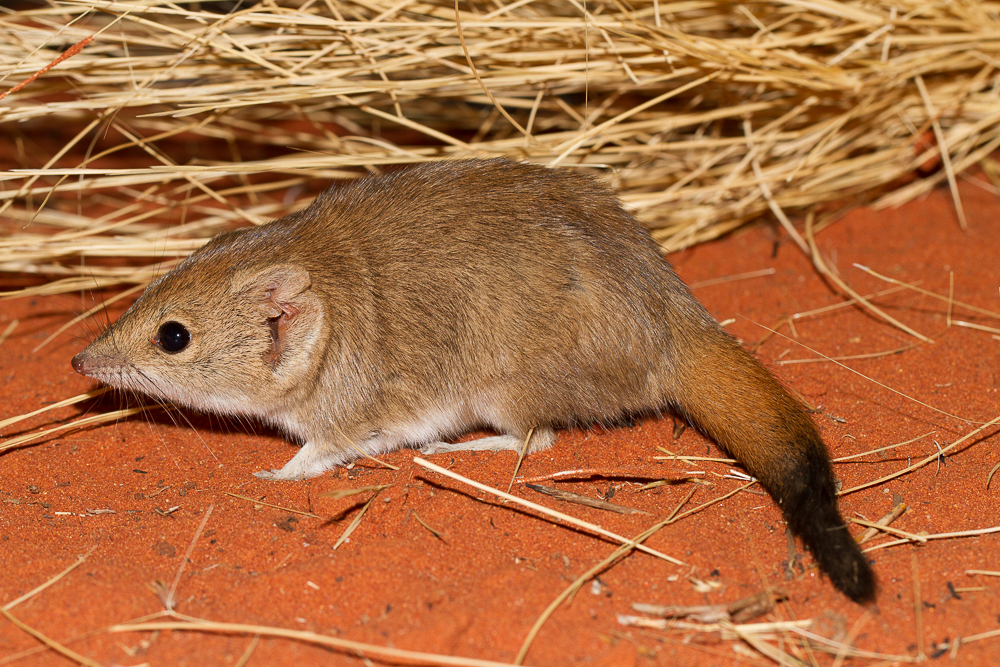
- Crest-tailed mulgara, Simpson Desert

Conservation status
- Vulnerable (EPBC Act)

- Least Concern (IUCN 3.1)

Scientific classification
- Kingdom: Animalia
- Phylum: Chordata
- Class: Mammalia
- Infraclass: Marsupialia
- Order: Dasyuromorphia
- Family: Dasyuridae
- Genus: Dasycercus
- Species: D. hillieri

Binomial name
- Dasycercus hillieri (Thomas, 1905)
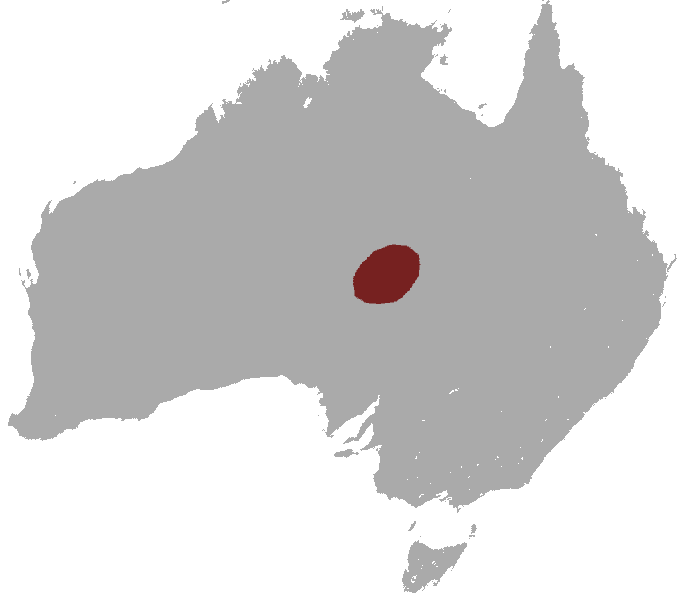
- Crest-tailed mulgara range

= Ampurta =

Crest-tailed mulgara Temporal range: Late Oligocene–Present

Species of marsupial

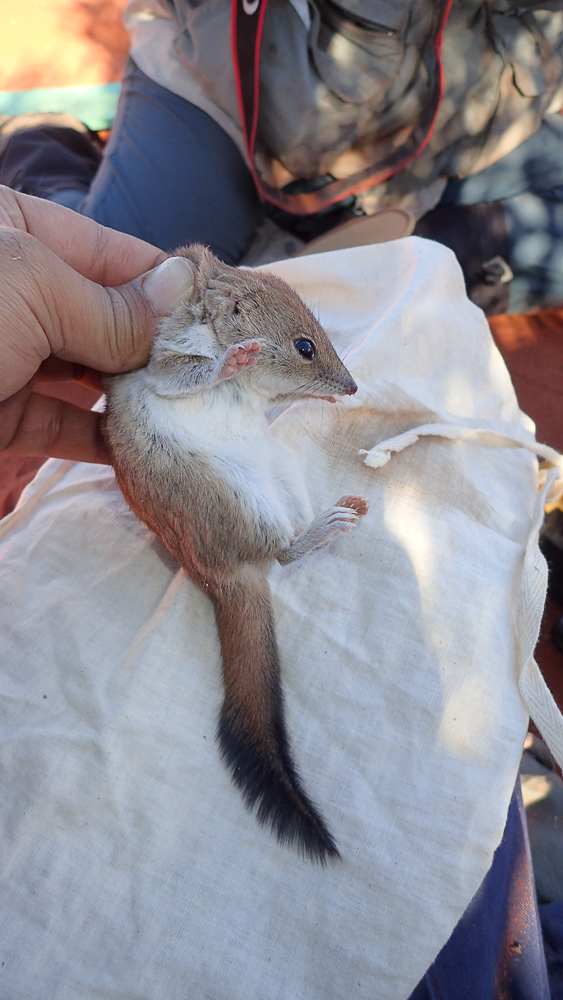
Crest-tailed mulgara showing distinguishing crest on tail

The ampurta (Dasycercus hillieri, recently resurrected from synonymy with D. cristicauda) is a small to medium-sized Australian carnivorous marsupial and a member of the family Dasyuridae (meaning "hairy tail") which includes quolls, dunnarts, numbats, the endangered Tasmanian devil and the extinct thylacine.

== Description ==
The crest-tailed mulgara is a small to medium-sized mammal with sandy coloured fur on the upper parts leading to a darker grey on the under parts and inner limbs. The species is strongly sexually dimorphic with adult males weighing 100 to 185 g (3.5 to 6.5 oz) and females weighing 65 to 120 g (2.3 to 4.2 oz). Head–body length of 125–230 mm (4.9–9.1 in) and tail length is between 75–125 mm (3.0–4.9 in).

In-field separation/identification of the two extant species within the genus Dasycercus has proven difficult, with the crest-tailed mulgara often confused with the closely related brush-tailed mulgara (D. blythi). Tail morphology is a primary identifying feature between the two species. The crest-tailed mulgara has a crest of fine black hairs along the dorsal edge of the tail creating a fin-like crest and hair length tapering towards the tip. In contrast the brush-tailed mulgara tail hair is not noticeably crested, black hair starts half way along the upper surface of the tail and dorsal hair length remains consistent. Nipple count also differs between the two species and is another distinguishing feature. Female crest-tailed mulgara typically have eight nipples, compared to the brush-tailed mulgara with just six.

== Taxonomy ==
There has been taxonomic confusion within the genus Dasycercus described by Peters in 1875. Four named forms of carnivorous marsupials have historically been assigned to this genus. Kreft, 1867, first described Chaetocercus cristicauda in 1877. A second form, Phascogale blythi was described by Waite, 1904, followed by a third form, Phascogale hillieri described by Thomas, 1905. Jones 1923, described two species of mulgara Dasycercus cristicauda and D. hillieri. but decades on, William Ride's A Guide to the Native Mammals of Australia published in 1970 referred only to a single species, Dasycercus cristicauda, and in 1988 Mahoney and Ride placed all three species in the synonymy of D. cristicauda. A fourth species, Dasyuroides byrnei, described by Spencer, 1896, was included by Mahoney and Ride however a lack of consensus resulted in its exclusion to the genus Dasycercus.

In 1995 Woolley described two sub-species, D. cristicauda cristicauda and D. cristicauda hillieri, which were later confirmed to be two species using mitochondrial gene sequencing by Adams, Cooper and Armstrong in 2000. Woolley resolved the taxonomic and nomenclatural issues in 2005 and the species was re-named to two genetically distinct forms, D. cristicauda previously D. hillieri and D. blythi previously named D. cristicauda.

Recently, three additional species have been described: the southern mulgara (D. archeri), the little mulgara (D. marlowi), and the northern mulgara (D. woolleyae). This same publication resurrected the name D. hillieri for the extant populations of crest-tailed mulgara, and determined that D. cristicauda is extinct.

Recent genetic analysis of most available and well-preserved tissue samples from around Australia suggests that only two species of mulgara are extant, and that these species conform well to the currently named D. blythi and D. hillieri. The question remains as to why some widely co-occurring and similarly-sized Dasycercus species would have gone extinct, since European colonisation, but others (i.e. the brush-tailed mulgara) have remained relatively common.

== Distribution ==
The crest-tailed mulgara inhabits areas of arid Australia. It has been recorded in the southern Simpson Desert near the tri-state border and in the Tirari and Strzelecki Deserts of South Australia and the western Lake Eyre region. Historically the species' geographic range was much larger incorporating areas from Ooldea on the eastern edge of the Nullarbor Plain and the Musgrave Ranges in South Australia, Sandringham Station in Queensland (last record in 1968) and from the Canning Stock Route and near Rawlinna on the Nullarbor Plain in Western Australia. Owl pellet examinations showed presence of crest-tailed mulgara near the southern and south-eastern margins of the Strzelecki dunefield/sandplain, in the Flinders Ranges and at Mutawintji National Park in far-western New South Wales. Due to the levels of taxonomic uncertainty, misidentification may have led to an overestimated distribution especially when based on older records. This has created difficulties in assessing and interpreting temporal changes within its historic distribution.

Recent genetic analysis of most available and well-preserved tissue samples from around Australia suggests that the crest-tailed mulgara is now restricted to the central eastern deserts (Simpson-Strzelecki Dunefield bioregion) of the continent, and the brush-tailed mulgara is more widespread from Queensland to near-coastal Western Australia.

== Ecology and habitat ==
=== Habitat ===
The crest-tailed mulgara inhabits crests and slopes of sand ridges, or around salt lakes in inland Australia. During the day it shelters in burrows which are located at the base of sandhill canegrass (Zygochloa paradoxa) clumps or Nitre bush (Nitraria billardieri) growing around the edges of salt lakes. Burrow site suitability, rainfall, food resources and the fire age of the vegetation community may be a factor influencing their distribution.

=== Diet ===
The crest-tail mulgara is an opportunistic or non-specialist carnivore, eating a range of insects, arachnids and rodents but also includes reptiles, centipedes and small marsupials. It forages along the dune crests and flanks with forays down onto the swales.

=== Breeding and reproduction ===
The crest-tailed mulgara reaches sexual maturity in the first year. Reproduction occurs between winter and early summer raising up to eight young in a litter. Independent young are found in spring and early summer

== Conservation status ==
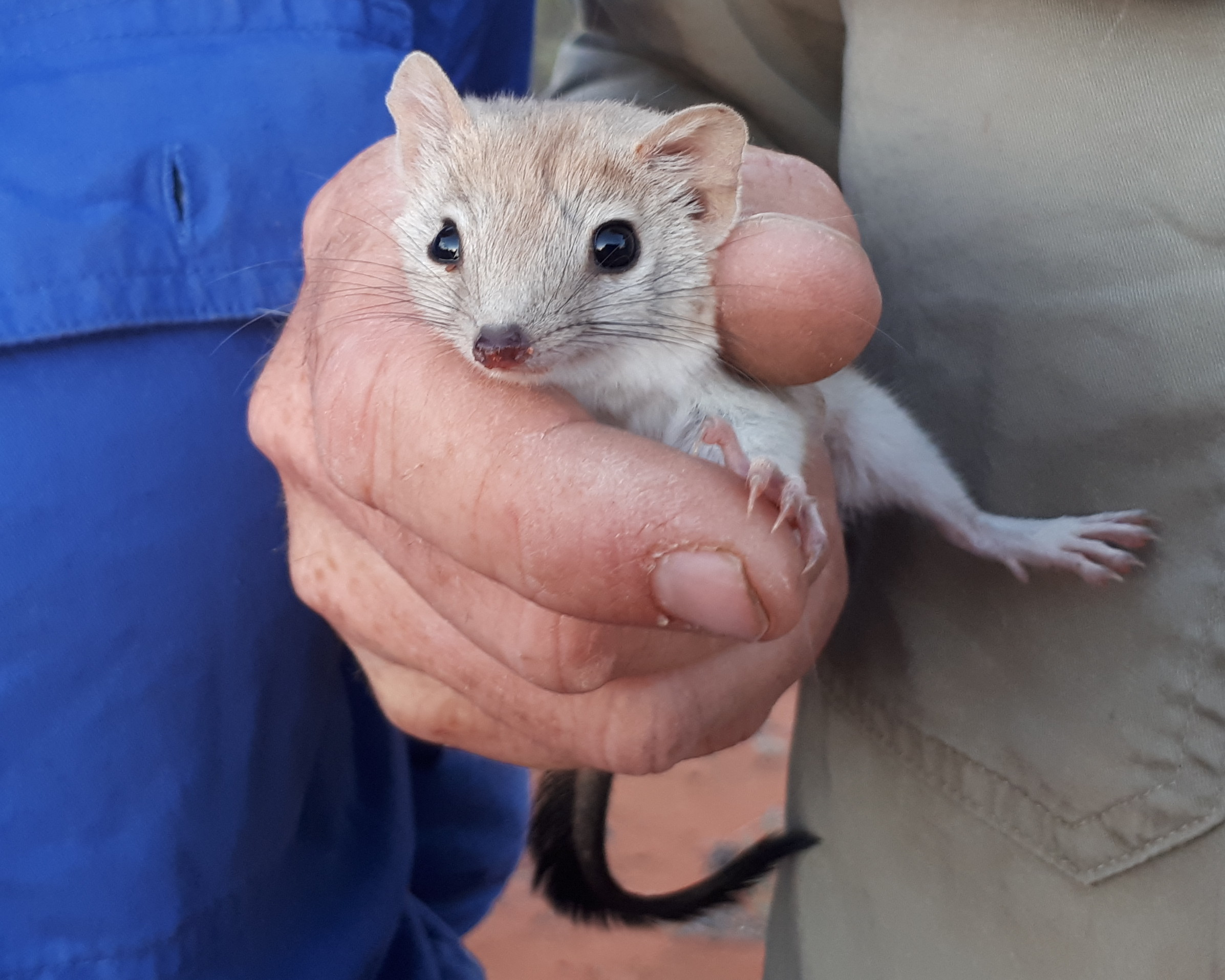
Wild Deserts Project, University of New South Wales, team member Reece Pedler holds a crest-tailed mulgara which was re-discovered in 2017 in Sturt National Park north-west of Tibooburra, Australia.

The mulgara was presumed extirpated in New South Wales for more than a century, but was re-discovered in 2017 in Sturt National Park north-west of Tibooburra.

The species was classified as Endangered in the 1900s, but the population rebounded in 2013 to Vulnerable. In 2019 it was classified as Least Concern, having expanded its range by over 48,000 km^{2} (19,000 sq mi) between 2015 and 2021. The comeback was primarily attributed to a decline in Australia's cat population thanks to efforts to reduce non-native rabbit populations (the cat's primary prey). Other factors that helped the species rebound include its ability to enter a torpid state, allowing the ampurta to survive conditions of severe drought.

== Threats ==
The crest-tailed mulgara is sensitive to predation by the European red fox and feral cat, changes to fire regimes together with environmental degradation and habitat homogenization attributed to grazing from livestock and introduced European rabbits. During post-release of rabbit hemorrhagic disease virus (RHDV), the crest-tailed mulgara underwent a 70-fold increase in its extent of occurrence and a 20-fold increase in its area of occupancy.
