= Buddle =

Buddle is a surname. Notable people with the surname include:

- Adam Buddle (1662–1715), English cleric and botanist
- Edson Buddle (born 1981), American soccer player
- Errol Buddle (1928–2018), Australian multi-instrumentalist
- Geoffrey Armstrong Buddle (1887–1951) New Zealand ornithologist and photographer
- John Buddle (1773–1843), English mining engineer
- Thomas Buddle (1812–1883), New Zealand missionary and Methodist leader

== See also ==
- Buddle pit
