= 1962–1963 Dominion Museum expedition =

Expedition to the Auckland Islands

- Country: New Zealand
- Location: Auckland Islands
- Country of origin: New Zealand
- Start: Lyttelton; 22 December 1962
- End: Dunedin; 21 January 1963
- Leader: Robert Falla
- Organiser: Dominion Museum; Department of Scientific and Industrial Research
- Affiliation: Dominion Museum; Department of Scientific and Industrial Research
- Vessels: USS Durant; USS Namakagon
- Participants: Eric Godley; Robert Falla; John Munne Moreland; Peter Wilfred James; Judson Linsley Gressitt; Keith Wise; John Yaldwyn; George Knox; Peter M. Johns; J. B. Wright; Francis John Fulton Fisher; Lionel Jack Dumbleton; Brian Bell; D. M. M. Macarthur

The 1962–1963 Dominion Museum expedition was a research expedition organised by the Dominion Museum and Department of Scientific and Industrial Research to study the biodiversity of the Auckland Islands. The expedition took place between December 1962 and January 1963.
