= 1972–1973 Auckland Islands Expedition =

Research expedition to the Auckland Islands 1972–1973

- Sponsor: Department of Lands and Survey and the United States National Science Foundation
- Country: New Zealand
- Leader: Brian Bell
- Start: Dunedin; 28 November 1972
- End: Dunedin; 3 March 1973
- Goal: Biological research at the Auckland Islands
- Ships: RV Acheron; St Michael; Marival

The 1972–1973 Auckland Islands Expedition was a research expedition undertaken between November 1972 and March 1973 to research the biodiversity of the Auckland Islands.

== Expedition planning ==
In 1972 the Ministry of Lands approved a research expedition proposal to take around 20 people to the Auckland Islands for the purposes of scientific research. The Ministry place a request with the Ministry of Defence to obtain logistical support from the New Zealand Navy for the expedition. In April the Department of Lands and Survey contacted a variety of scientific institutions both from within New Zealand and internationally, including the United States National Science Foundation, inviting applications to participate in the expedition. In May 1972 the Ministry of Defence decided that the New Zealand Navy would be unable to provide transport to the Auckland Islands expedition. As a result, participants of the expedition were then expected to contribute NZ$500 each to charter a boat to transport them to and from the Islands.

It was recommended by Professor G. A. Knox that the vessel RV Acheron be chartered for the duration of the expedition, thus allowing participants to visit the larger islands in the Auckland Islands group. However the cost of hiring this vessel for the proposed three month length of the expedition was expensive. The Department of Lands and Survey commenced negotiations with the United States National Science Foundation to help fund the expedition with the latter organisation offering US$12,000 in support of the Foundation's six nominees participating in the expedition. The New Zealand government undertook to cover the remaining costs of the expedition. Other funders of the expedition included the Dominion Museum and several New Zealand universities.

The Wildlife Service organised the provision of stores and equipment for the expedition and also provided the expedition leader Brian Bell, who coordinated the communication and transportation.

== Expedition aims ==
The expedition aimed to establish base line information on the status of ecology of the Auckland Islands as well as distribution data on species found on the Islands.

== Participants ==
Participants in the 1972–1973 Auckland Islands Expedition included the following:

- Brian Bell, Wildlife service, expedition leader and ornithologist
- Hugh Best, University of Canterbury, zoologist studying the New Zealand sea lion
- D. John Campbell, DSIR, studying Auckland Islands goats and their distribution
- Chris Neville Challies, New Zealand forestry service, distribution, number and feeding of wild pigs
- Ralph S. Common, Michigan State University, bryologist specialising in liverworts
- Peter G. Connors, University of California, specimen collection
- John Stewart Dugdale, DSIR, entomologist
- John A. K. Farrell DSIR, entomologist
- Henry Andrew Imshaug, Michigan State University, lichenologist
- Carol J. Horning, University of Canterbury, invertebrate studies, particularly tardigrades
- Donald S. Horning, University of Canterbury, invertebrate studies, particularly tardigrades
- Karl A. Johnson, University of Auckland, phycologist
- Peter N. Johnson, University of Otago, collection of bryophytes and algae for the Dominion Museum and vascular plants for Otago University
- Judith E. King, University of New South Wales, zoologist studying the New Zealand sea lion
- Basil J. Marlow, Australian Museum, zoologist studying the New Zealand sea lion
- Ronald Jack Nilsson, Wildlife service, Department of Internal Affairs, ornithologist
- Christopher John Rutherford Robertson, Wildlife Service, ornithologist studying the breeding distribution of albatross
- Michael Robert Rudge, DSIR, studying feral goats and their distribution
- Rodney Russ, Wildlife service, ornithologist
- Dr Michael Fryer Soper, from Arrowtown, medical officer, ornithologist and photographer
- Gerard Frederick van Tets, CSIRO, ornithologist studying the Auckland Islands shag
- Dale Hadley Vitt, University of Alberta, bryologist specialising in mosses
- Milton Webster Weller, Iowa State University, ornithologist studying the Auckland Islands teal and other waterfowl
- Gordon R. Williams, Wildlife Service, ornithologist studying the Auckland Islands Rail and searching for the Auckland Island merganser
- Kerry-Jayne Wilson, biologist

== Expedition ==
The expedition left Dunedin on the 28th of November 1972 with transport to and from the Auckland Islands being provided by the vessel RV Acheron. This boat which made two trips each way from Dunedin to the Auckland Islands as well as a changeover trip in the middle of the expedition. The main expedition camp was established at the Coast Watching Station at Ranui Cove on Auckland Island. Other camps were set up at Erebus Cove as well as on Ewing Island, Musgrave Inlet, Magnetic Bay, Fairchilds Garden on Adams Island, Rose Island and near Deas Head. The final return voyage for the expedition arrived in Dunedin on the 3 March 1973.

== Noteworthy events ==
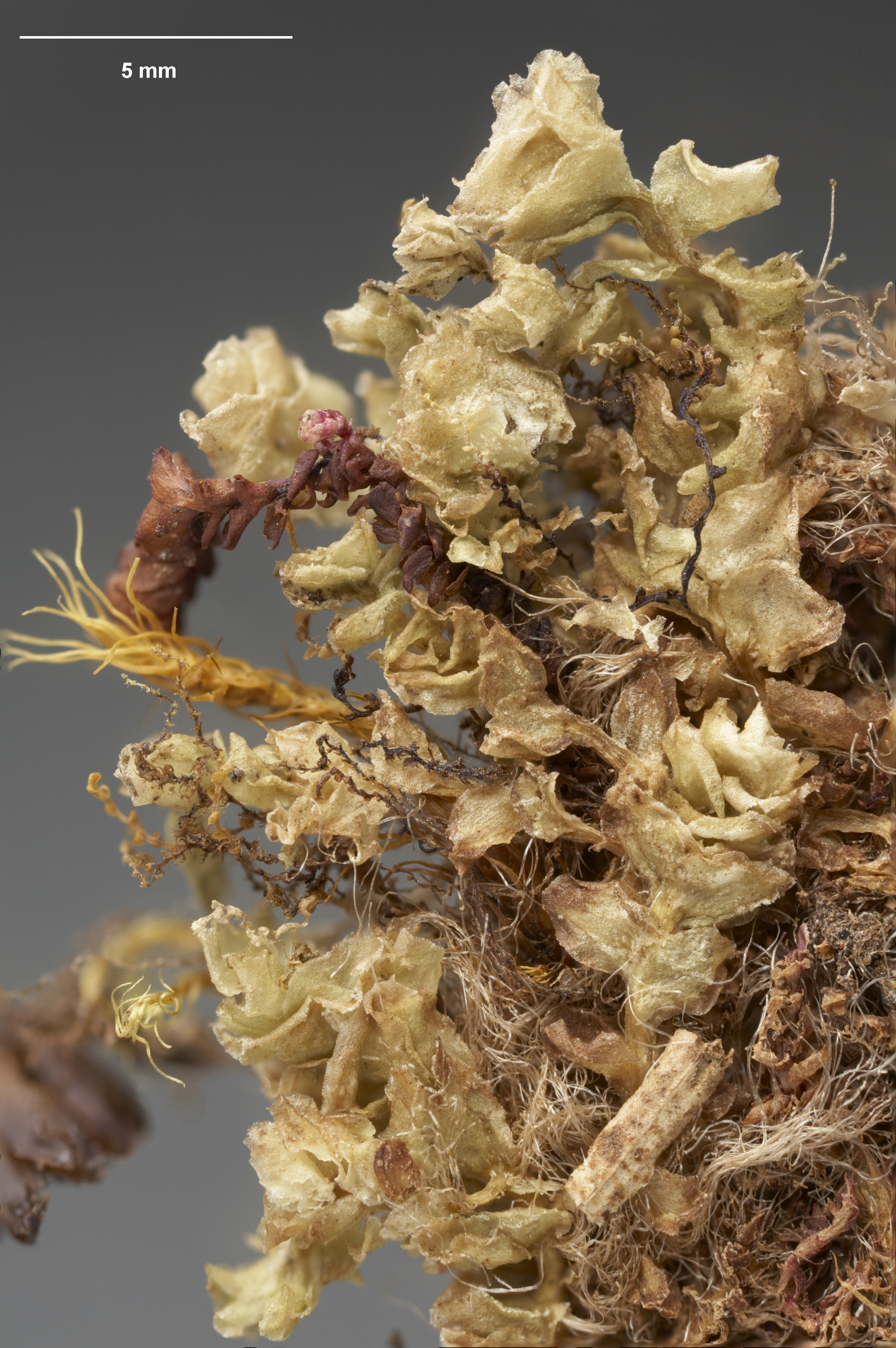
MA I134730 Holotype of Pachyschistochila latiloba.

The holotype specimen for the lichen species Lecidea aurantia was collected by Imshaug during this expedition. The holotype specimen of the liverwort species Pachyschistochila latiloba was collected by Peter N. Johnson.
