= Te Haeata =

Defunct New Zealand newspaper

- Cover of Te Haeata.
- Type: Monthly Newspaper
- Publisher: Thomas Buddle
- Founded: 1 April 1859
- Ceased publication: 1 March 1862
- Language: Te Reo Māori

Te Haeata (lit. 'The Dawn') was a Wesleyan newspaper published in the Māori language. Edited by Wesleyan missionary, Thomas Buddle, Te Haeata was the first denominational newspaper in New Zealand. It was first published in April 1859 and ceased publication in March 1862.

== History ==
The Wesleyan Missionary Society (WMS) established its first mission in New Zealand at Whangaroa in 1823, focusing on spreading Christianity and literacy. In 1859, a committee of Wesleyan ministers under the leadership of Thomas Buddle determined to publish a periodical in the Māori language to 'supply our people with a little reading adapted to promote their religious and social progress.' The first edition of Te Haeata was issued on 1 April 1859.

Te Haeata faced challenging circumstances, including the decreased willingness of the WMS to support the Māori mission, the increased necessity to accommodate the spiritual needs of European settlers to New Zealand, and the wars in Waikato and Taranaki. For these reasons, Te Haeata published its last edition on 1 March 1862.

== Publications ==
In its three years, the newspaper issued 36 editions over three volumes. Te Haeata was printed in three columns separated by vertical rules. The newspaper was printed at W.C. Wilson's Shortland Street printing office. All issues had four pages, and editions cost 2s. 6d. per annum or 3d. each.

Te Haeata covered a range of issues, including scriptural lessons, meetings held by Wesleyan missionaries, moral tales, and the Kohimarama Conference. The main message conveyed in Te Haeata was the inadequacy of the Māori Wesleyan church. Mākutu was frequently decried as a threat to Māori Christianity and readers were encouraged to abandon these 'works of darkness.'

While the newspaper was not overtly Wesleyan in its religious themes, it drew a clear distinction between Protestantism and Roman Catholicism. Te Haeata described Protestantism as the 'True Church' and criticised practices such as idol worship, praying to Mary, and what it referred to as 'errors' within Catholicism.

== Bibliography ==
- Sutherland, Yvonne (2002). "Church and Identity in the Wesleyan Newspaper, Te Haeata". In Curnow, Jenifer; Hopa, Ngapere; McRae, Jane (eds.). Rere atu, taku manu! Discovering History, Language and Politics in the Maori Language Newspapers, 1842-1933. Auckland: Auckland University Press. pp. 98–114. ISBN 1-86940-279-0.
