= Northland temperate kauri forests =

Terrestrial ecoregion in New Zealand

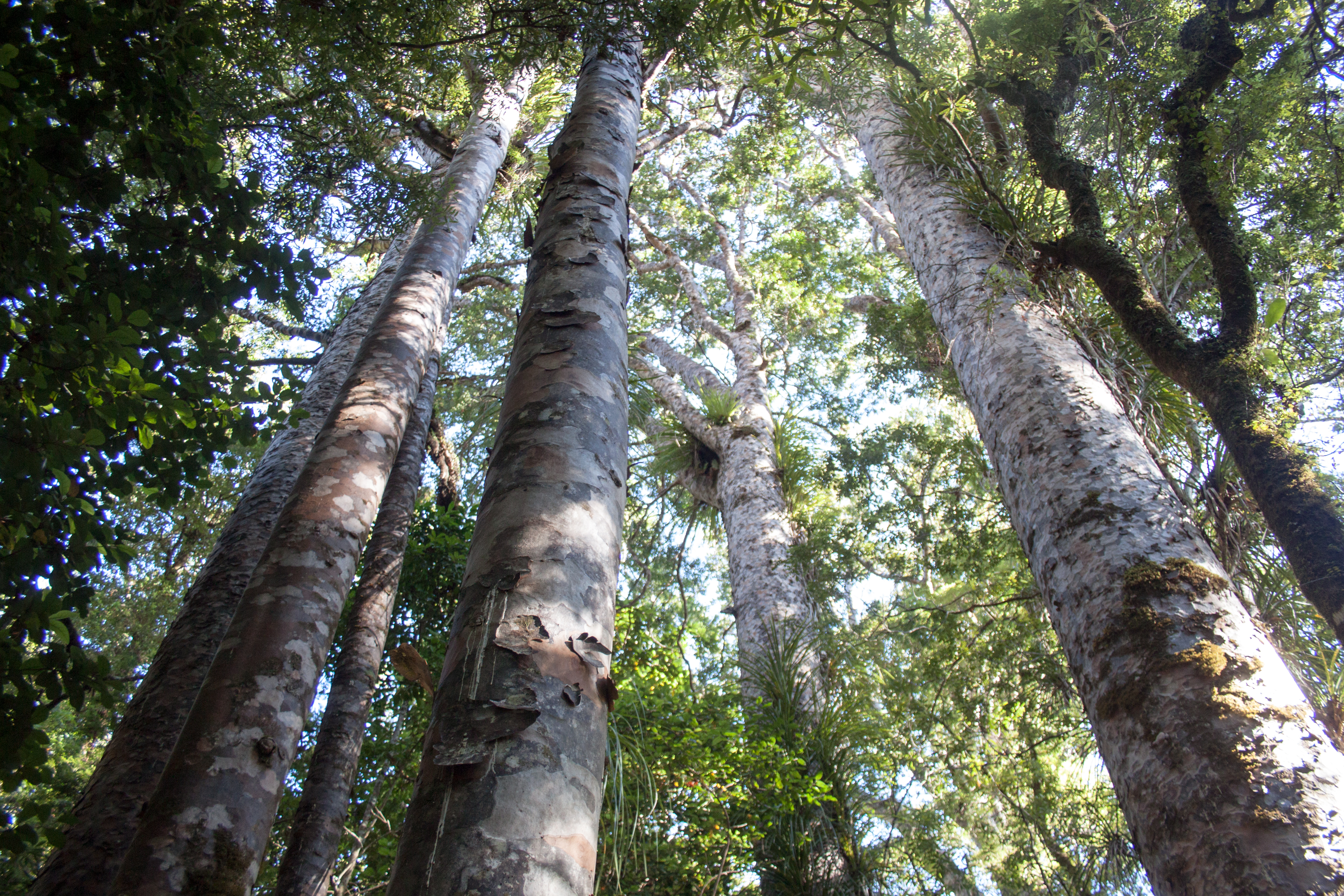
- Kauri trees (Agathis australis) in Waipoua Forest

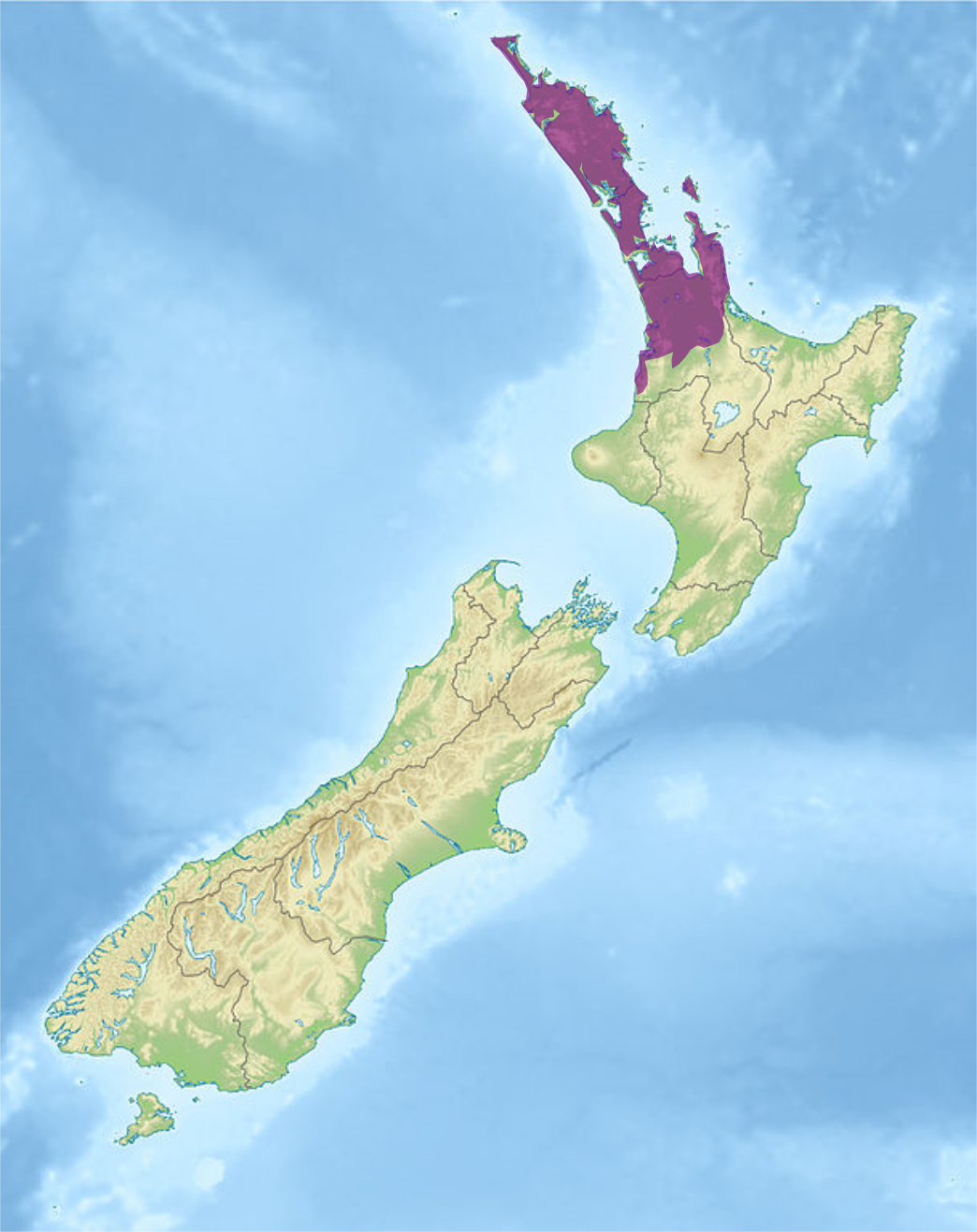
- Ecoregion territory (in purple)

Ecology
- Realm: Australasian
- Biome: temperate broadleaf and mixed forests
- Borders: Northland temperate forests

Geography
- Area: 28,786 km^{2} (11,114 mi^{2})
- Country: New Zealand
- Regions: Auckland; Northland; Waikato
- Coordinates: 36.6°S 174.56°E

Conservation
- Protected: 3,555 km^{2} (12%)

The Northland temperate kauri forests is an ecoregion in northern New Zealand, within the temperate broadleaf and mixed forests biome.

== Location and description ==
This ecoregion covers the northern end of North Island. The landscape is flat when compared with most of New Zealand and includes the regions of Northland, Auckland around the city of Auckland and Waikato around the town of Hamilton. Kauri trees are found north of 38°S. The region also includes a number of offshore islands and some of New Zealand's few remaining original wetland habitats such as the Firth of Thames, and the Kopuatai Peat Dome and the Whangamarino Wetland in the Hauraki Plains. The climate is warm and humid.

== Flora ==
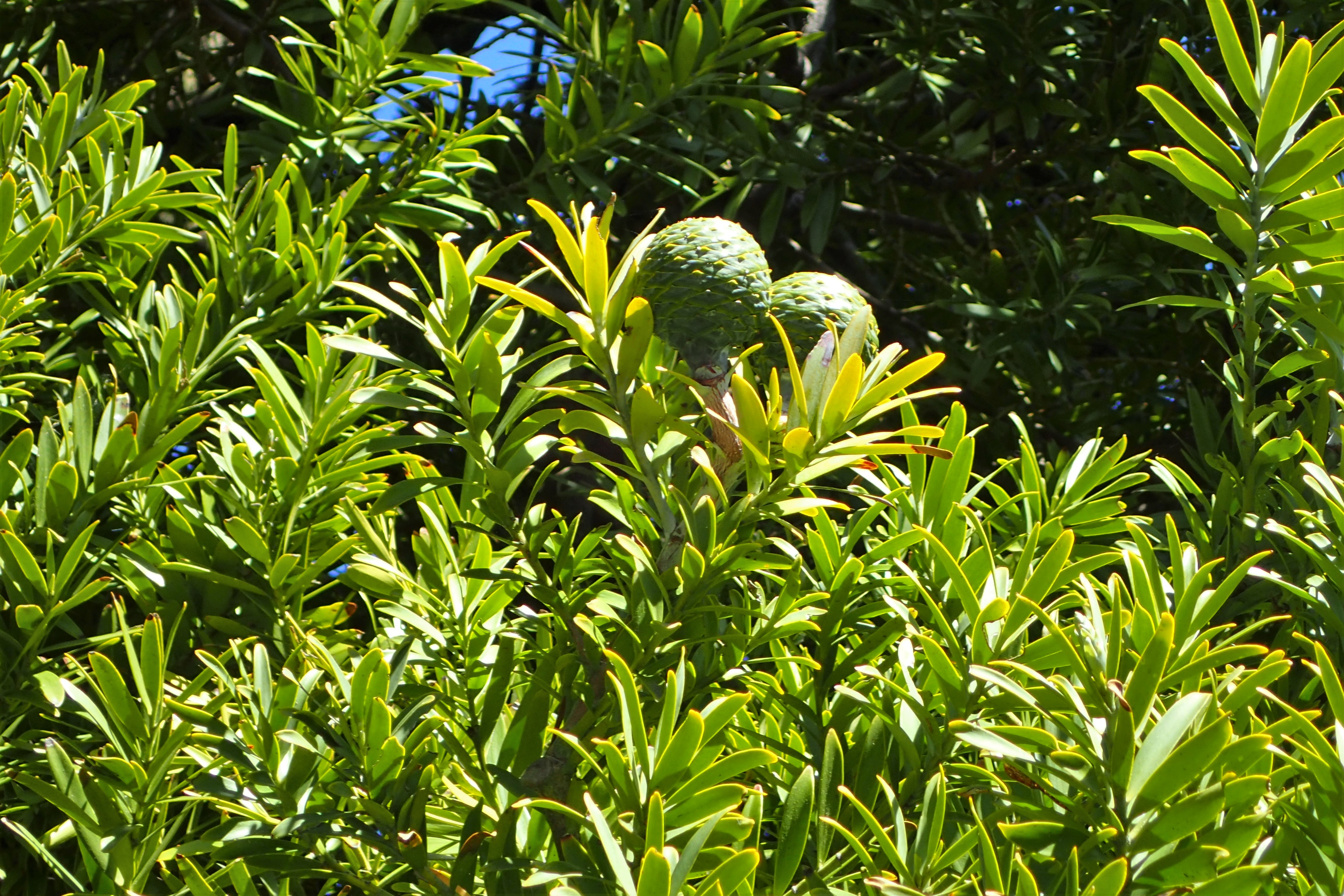
Agathis australis leaves

This area is home to a number of endemic plants especially in regions of Northland such as Cape Reinga and Te Paki which have at times been cut off from the rest of the island by high sea levels. The ecoregion is named for its most notable endemic species, the impressive southern kauri trees, which can grow to 55m high and 20m round and has no lower branches but a long trunk of up to 30m and a wide crown. There are few areas still thickly covered by the kauri forest that once dominated this whole area, but the trees are so huge that they are the most noticeable feature even in woodland where they are present in small numbers. Much of the kauri forest has been cleared for timber and the land converted to agriculture. This region is the southernmost habitat of the kauri and also mangroves. There are more endemic species on the offshore islands such as the Poor Knights Islands and Three Kings Islands, which are home to rare plants including the only species of Elingamita and others such as Pennantia baylisiana and Three Kings vine.

== Ecosystem ==
The forests are home to a number of rare birds including the endangered North Island kōkako wattlebird, the North Island brown kiwi, and three endemic parrots red-crowned parakeet, the New Zealand kaka and the kākāpō, the last of which now only survives on the offshore Little Barrier Island. Invertebrates found in the region include the large wētā and cave wētā.

== Threats and preservation ==
This fertile area has long been the most populous part of New Zealand and the original kauri forest has mostly been removed. The logging and gum-tapping that caused this has stopped now and much of the remaining kauri forest is now protected in the Northland region and on the Coromandel Peninsula. The largest stands of kauri are found in Waipoua Forest with another large area in Trounson Kauri Park south of Aranga, both areas are on the west coast of Northland.

Wildlife in the region is vulnerable to introduced predators such as the Polynesian rat, ferrets and stoats to the extent that the strongest remaining populations of many plants, birds and reptiles are on offshore islands rather than North Island itself. Some North Island species have been introduced to the offshore as a preservation measure, while other species found there are indigenous to the small islands, including a number of lizards on the Mercury Islands and the Falla's skink on the Three Kings Islands.

== See also ==
- Kauri gum
- Agathis
