= Robert Falla =

New Zealand ornithologist and museum director (1901–1979)

Sir Robert Falla KBE CMG
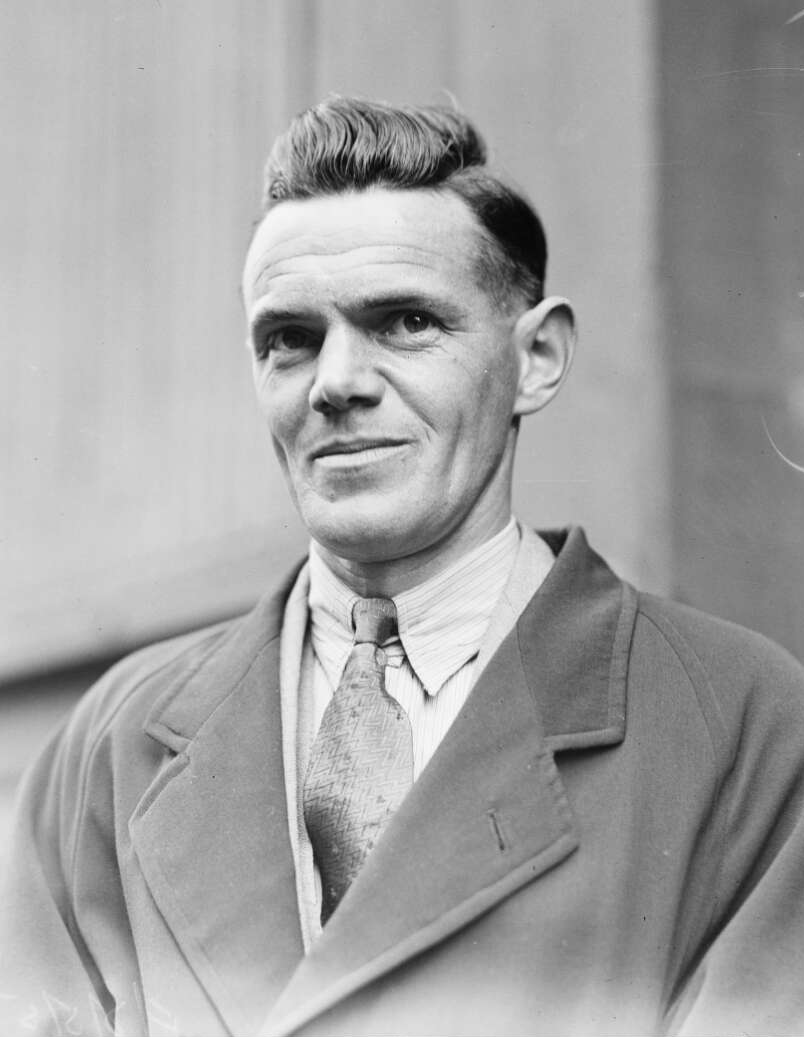
- Falla in 1930

Director of the Dominion Museum
- In office 1947–1966

Personal details
- Born: Robert Alexander Falla; 21 July 1901 Palmerston North, New Zealand
- Died: 23 February 1979 (aged 77) Eastbourne, New Zealand
- Spouse: Elayne Mary Burton (m. 1928; died 1978)
- Children: 3

Sir Robert Alexander Falla KBE CMG (21 July 1901 – 23 February 1979) was a New Zealand museum administrator and ornithologist.

== Early life ==
Falla was born in Palmerston North in 1901 to George Falla and his wife, Elizabeth Kirk. As his father was working for the railways, the family shifted frequently, and he lived in Hāwera, Masterton, and Invercargill. At his primary school in Invercargill, he developed an interest in natural history due to the influence of Alfred Philpott. Falla gained a junior national scholarship and studied at Auckland Grammar School, from where he graduated in 1918. He pursued his dream of going to sea for a few years in various jobs, but then started to follow his interest in ornithology, first through part-time study at Auckland University College, and then at Auckland Training College, a training institution for teachers. He transferred to the university in Auckland, from where he graduated in 1924 with a Bachelor of Arts, in after some teaching at primary schools, with a Master of Arts in 1927.

== Professional career ==
Falla was assistant zoologist with the British, Australian and New Zealand Antarctic Research Expedition (BANZARE) under Sir Douglas Mawson 1929–1931. He was the founding president of the Ornithological Society of New Zealand. He was involved in the organisation of the wartime subantarctic Cape Expedition coastwatching programme of 1941–1945. He led the 1947 Snares Islands expedition to study subantarctic birds. Although he was not listed an official member, Falla participated for a brief time in the 1949 New Zealand American Fiordland Expedition. He also led the 1962–1963 Dominion Museum expedition to the Auckland Islands.

He held positions in various New Zealand museums including director of Canterbury Museum from 1 March 1937 to 1947, and director of the Dominion Museum, Wellington, from 1947 until 1966. He was a member of the Royal Australasian Ornithologists Union (RAOU), president 1951–1952, and made a fellow of the Royal Australasian Ornithologists Union in 1973.

He described Pycroft's petrel (Pterodroma pycrofti). Falla's skink (Oligosoma fallai) is named for him, as is the Ornithological Society of New Zealand's Robert Falla Memorial Award.

In 1953, Falla was awarded the Queen Elizabeth II Coronation Medal. In the 1959 Queen's Birthday Honours, he was appointed a Companion of the Order of St Michael and St George, in recognition of his services as director of the Dominion Museum. In the 1973 New Year Honours, Falla was appointed a Knight Commander of the Order of the British Empire, for services to conservation.

== Family and death ==
On 18 May 1928, Falla married Elayne Mary Burton, known as Molly, at Te Aroha; they were to have two daughters and one son, Graham. His wife died on 31 May 1978. Falla collapsed and died at his home in the Lower Hutt suburb of Eastbourne on 23 February 1979. His son-in-law through his daughter Elayne was Joseph Trapp.
