= Little mulgara =

Conservation status
- Extinct (IUCN 3.1)

Scientific classification
- Kingdom: Animalia
- Phylum: Chordata
- Class: Mammalia
- Infraclass: Marsupialia
- Order: Dasyuromorphia
- Family: Dasyuridae
- Genus: Dasycercus
- Species: †D. marlowi

Binomial name
- †Dasycercus marlowi Newman-Martin & Travouillon, 2023

Extinct species of marsupial

The little mulgara (Dasycercus marlowi) is an extinct species of mulgara that was formally described in 2023. The species is named posthumously after Basil Marlow the Australian mammalogist and former curator of mammals at the Australian Museum. It was last seen in 1965 and declared extinct by the IUCN in 2026.

As the name suggests, the little mulgara is the smallest of the mulgaras. The total length of the holotype, and only specimen, is 195 mm (7.7 in).
