= Robert Falla Memorial Award =

Award granted by the Ornithological Society of New Zealand

The Robert Falla Memorial Award (sometimes referred to as the Falla Award) is granted by the Ornithological Society of New Zealand to people "who have made a significant contribution to both the Ornithological Society of New Zealand and to New Zealand ornithology".

It was set up in memory of Robert Falla after his death in 1979, using contributions from a public appeal. The first award was made in 1981, but for the first few years awards were made for the preceding year. In some years no award is made.

== Recipients ==
- 1981: Ross McKenzie
- 1982: Archie Blackburn
- 1983: A.T. Edgar
- 1984: R.B. Sibson
- 1985: Maida Barlow
- 1986: Peter Child (posthumous)
- 1987: Peter Bull
- 1988: Brian Douglas Bell
- 1989: Graham Turbott
- 1990: Barrie Heather
- 1992: Beth Brown
- 1995: Paul Sagar
- 1997: David Crockett
- 1999: Hugh Robertson
- 2002: Christopher John Rutherford Robertson
- 2010: Brian Gill
- 2011: Ralph Powlesland
- 2012: Kerry-Jayne Wilson
- 2012: David Medway
- 2014: Nick Allen
- 2016: Colin O'Donnell
- 2018: David Melville
- 2019: Andrew Crossland
- 2022: Graeme Taylor
- 2023: Elizabeth (Biz) Bell
- 2024: Raewyn Empson
- 2025: Tim Lovegrove
- 2026: Mary Thompson
- 2026: Alan Tennyson

== See also ==
- List of ornithology awards
