= Judith King =

British zoologist

- Born: 1 January 1926; Essex, England
- Died: 1 April 2010 (aged 84); Maitland, New South Wales, Australia
- Other name: Judith Marlow
- Education: University of London
- Spouse: Basil Marlow
- Awards: Fellow of the Royal Zoological Society of New South Wales, Honorary member of the Society of Marine Mammalogists
- Scientific career
- Fields: marine mammalogy

Judith Eveleigh King (1926–2010, married name - Judith Marlow) was a British born zoologist who specialised in pinnipeds (seals).

== Education and career ==
King graduated with honours from the University of London in 1948. She worked for 20 years in London at the Natural History section of the British Museum, and from 1969 to 1984 in the zoology department of the University of New South Wales. She retired from her position as Principal Scientific Officer in 1968. As well as publishing scholarly papers on taxonomy, her books Marine Mammals with Richard Harrison, and Seals of the World (1964, updated 1983) are standard reference works.

King participated in the 1972–1973 Auckland Islands Expedition where she studied the New Zealand sea lion on the Auckland Islands.

== Awards ==
King was made a Fellow of the Royal Zoological Society of New South Wales in December 1987. She was a charter member of the Society of Marine Mammalogists and was made an Honorary Member in 2000.

== Personal life ==
King married Basil Marlow who was the Curator of Mammals at the Australian Museum in Sydney. After her marriage she was generally known as Judy Marlow. She died in April 2010 at Maitland, in the Hunter Valley, New South Wales. Australia.

== Publications ==
- King, Judith E. (1969) "Some aspects of the anatomy of the Ross seal, Ommatophoca rossi (Pinnipedia: Phocidae)."
- King, Judith E. (1969) "The identity of the fur seals of Australia." Australian journal of zoology 17.5: 841-853.
- King, Judith E. (1977) "Comparative anatomy of the major blood vessels of the sealions Neophoca and Phocarctos; with comments on the differences between the otariid and phocid vascular systems." Journal of Zoology 181.1: 69-94.
- King, Judith E. (1961) "The feeding mechanism and jaws of the crabeater seal (Lobodon carcinophagus).": 462-466.
- Marlow, B. J., and Judith E. King. (1974) "Sea lions and fur seals of Australia and New Zealand-the growth of knowledge." Australian mammalogy 1.3: 117-135.
- King, Judith E. (1966) "Relationships of the hooded and elephant seals (genera Cystophora and Mirounga)." Journal of Zoology 148.4: 385-398.
- King, Judith E., and R. J. Harrison.(1961)."Some notes on the Hawaiian monk seal."
- King, Judith E.(1978) "On the specific name of the southern sea lion (Pinnipedia, Otariidae)." Journal of Mammalogy 59.4: 861-863.
- King, Judith E.(1964) "The monk seal of the Pacific." Zeitschrift fur Saugetierkunde 29: 37-42.
- King, Judith E.(1973) "Pleistocene Ross seal (Ommatophoca rossi) from New Zealand (Note).": 391-397.
- King, Judith E. (1968) "The Ross and other Antarctic seals." Australian Natural History 16.1: 29-32.
- King, Judith E. (1957) "On a pup of the crabeater seal Lobodon carcinophagus." Annals and Magazine of Natural History 10.116: 619-624.
- King, Judith. E. (1976) "On the identity of the three young fur seals (genus Arctocephalus) stranded in New Caledonia (Mammalia, Pinnipedia)." Beaufortia 25.324: 97-105.
- King, Judith E. (1968) "On the identity of the fur seals of Australia." Nature 219.5154: 632-633.
- King, Judith E. (1965) "Giant epiphyses in a Ross seal." Nature 205.4970: 515-516.
