= North Island temperate forests =

Terrestrial ecoregion in New Zealand

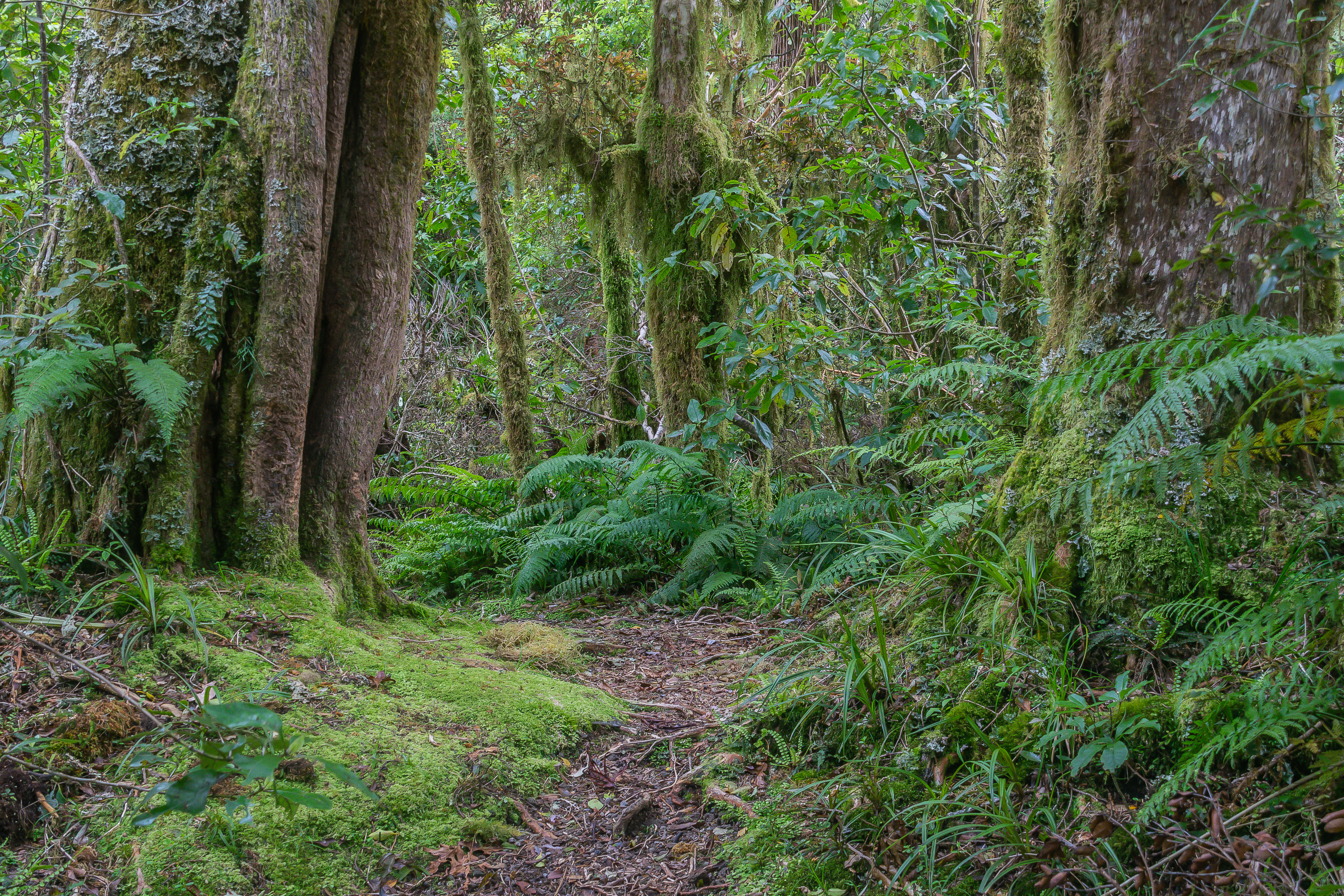
- Egmont National Park

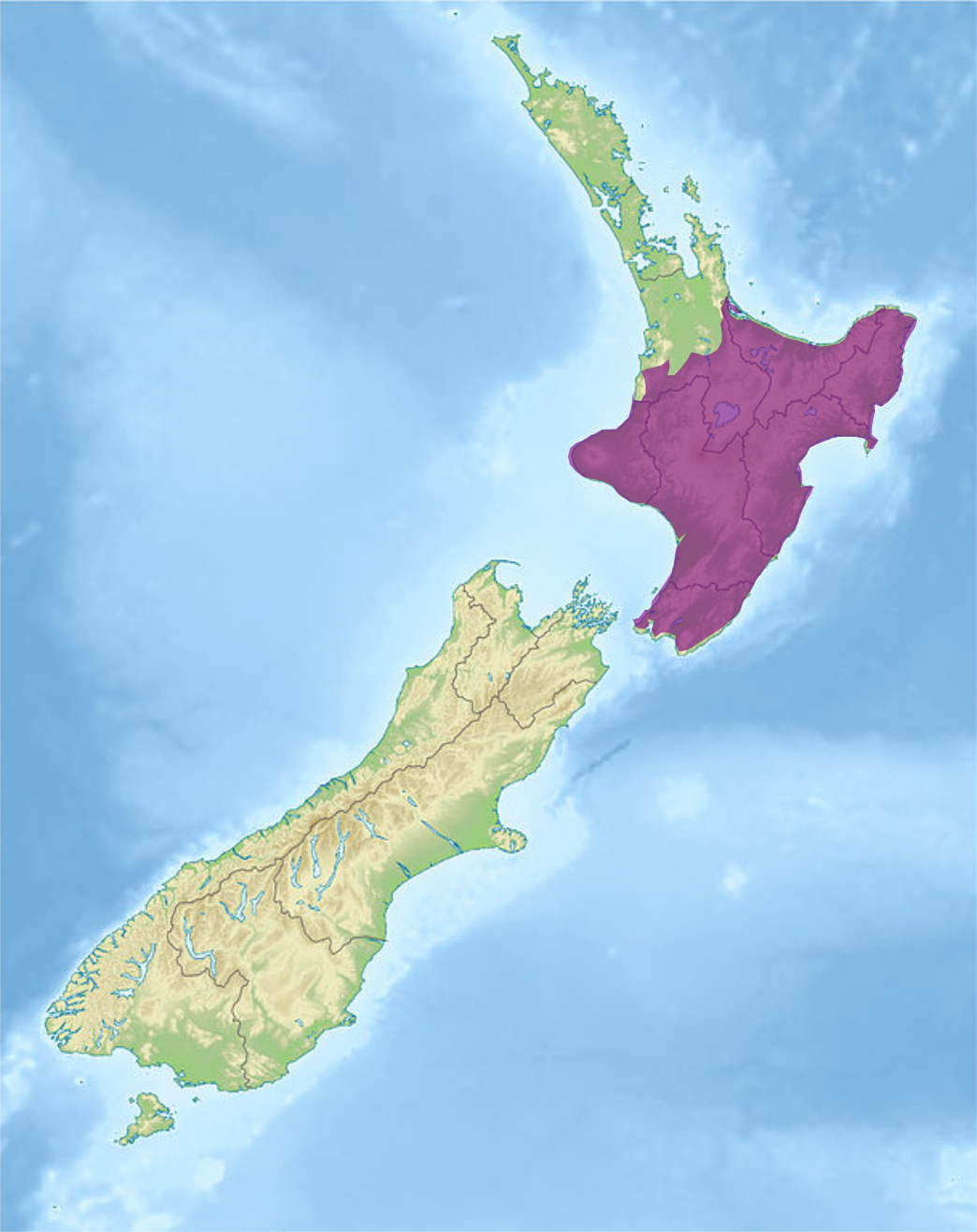
- Ecoregion territory (in purple)

Ecology
- Realm: Australasian
- Biome: temperate broadleaf and mixed forests
- Borders: Northland temperate kauri forests

Geography
- Area: 84,041 km^{2} (32,448 sq mi)
- Country: New Zealand
- Regions: Bay of Plenty; Gisborne; Hawke's Bay; Manawatū-Whanganui; Taranaki; Waikato, Wellington
- Coordinates: 39°S 176.1°E

Conservation
- Protected: 16,274 km² (19%)

The North Island temperate forests, also known as the Northland temperate forests, is a temperate broadleaf and mixed forests ecoregion on New Zealand’s North Island.

== Geography ==
The ecoregion has an area of 84,041 square kilometres (32,448 sq mi), which covers most of the North Island. The ecoregion extends from sea level to high volcanic peaks. The northern portion of the island, including the Northland Peninsula, Coromandel Peninsula, and the lowland region around Hamilton, are part of the separate Northland temperate kauri forests ecoregion.

The North Island Volcanic Plateau occupies the center of the island. Lake Taupō, New Zealand's largest lake, sits in a volcanic caldera formed during a violent eruption 2000 years ago. The volcanic peaks of Mount Tongariro (1,978 m), Mount Ngauruhoe (2,291 m), and Mount Ruapehu (2,797 m) lie south of Lake Taupō. Much of the plateau is covered lava fields, volcanic mudflows (lahars), and deposits of volcanic ash.

Mount Taranaki (2,518 m) is an active volcano, which lies on the west of the volcanic plateau near the island's west coast.

A belt of folded mountains, which includes the Tararua Range and the Kaimanawa Range, runs parallel to the east coast from Wellington at the southern tip of the island to East Cape in the northeast. These mountains are predominantly of sedimentary greywacke, in contrast to the igneous rocks of the volcanic plateau. There are coastal lowlands along the eastern, western, and northern shores of the island.

== Flora ==
In the lowland forests, emergent podocarps rimu (Dacrydium cupressinum) and mataī (Prumnopitys taxifolia) rise above a canopy of evergreen broadleaf trees that includes kamahi (Pterophylla racemosa) and tawa (Beilschmiedia tawa).

Middle-elevation forests on the volcanic plateau are dominated by podocarps, including rimu, miro (Prumnopitys ferruginea), mataī, tōtara (Podocarpus totara) and kahikatea (Dacrycarpus dacrydioides). Middle elevation forests on Mount Taranaki include Hall's totara (Podocarpus laetus) and kaikawaka (Libocedrus bidwillii).

Higher-elevation plant communities include southern beech (Nothofagus) forests and tussock grasslands. Shrublands of leatherwoods, including Olearia colensoi and Brachyglottis rotundifolia are common at the treeline, with tough leaves that resist water loss from the mountain winds. Alpine communities, principally tussock grasslands, occur above the treeline.

== Fauna ==
The ecoregion is home to several threatened native species, including the North Island brown kiwi (Apteryx mantelli), lesser short-tailed bat (Mystacina tuberculata), and North Island kōkako (Callaeas wilsoni). Native reptiles include Whitaker's skink (Cyclodina whitakeri), forest gecko (Mokopirirakau granulatus), and Wellington green gecko (Naultinus punctatus).

== Conservation and threats ==
Most of the ecoregion's original forest is gone. In the lowlands it has mostly been replaced by agriculture, and on the plateau by pastureland and extensive plantations of exotic timber trees, principally radiata pine (Pinus radiata) introduced from California in the 19th century.

Prior to human settlement of New Zealand, birds were the largest land animals, and the only land mammals were bats. The ecoregion was home to several species of flightless moa, Haast's eagle (Hieraaetus moorei), the flightless New Zealand swan (Cygnus sumnerensis) and the North Island goose (Cnemiornis gracilis). The Māori arrived around 1280, and are the first known humans to inhabit New Zealand. The early settlers hunted many of the large birds, including the moas, native swan, and native goose, to extinction. They brought with them the Polynesian rat (Rattus exulans). Europeans settled in the 19th century, and brought with them the black rat (Rattus rattus), domestic cat (Felis catus), Norway rat (Rattus norvegicus), and stoat (Mustela erminea). These introduced predators took a heavy toll on the native birds and insects, some of which survive only or mainly on offshore islands free from exotic predators. Introduced goats and Common brushtail possums (Trichosurus vulpecula) heavily browse the lowland forests, and possums have decimated kamahi and rata in lowland forests and kaikawaka and Hall’s totara in the southern ranges.

== Protected areas ==
A 2017 assessment found that 16,274 km², or 19%, of the ecoregion is in protected areas. 48% of the unprotected area is still forested. Protected areas include Tongariro National Park (788.53 km²) on the volcanic plateau, Egmont National Park (341.49 km²) which protects Mount Taranaki, Whanganui National Park on the western side of the plateau, Te Urewera (2090.72 km²) in the eastern highlands, and Tararua Forest Conservation Park (1149.21 km²) in the south.
