= Crest-tailed mulgara =

Conservation status
- Extinct (IUCN 3.1)

Scientific classification
- Kingdom: Animalia
- Phylum: Chordata
- Class: Mammalia
- Infraclass: Marsupialia
- Order: Dasyuromorphia
- Family: Dasyuridae
- Genus: Dasycercus
- Species: †D. cristicauda

Binomial name
- †Dasycercus cristicauda (Krefft, 1867)

Species of marsupial

The crest-tailed mulgara (Dasycercus cristicauda) was a small Australian carnivorous marsupial. It was previously recognised as a senior synonym of the ampurta (D. hillieri), also commonly known as the crest-tailed mulgara, but is now believed to be a separate extinct taxon. The same investigation also described the southern mulgara (D. archeri), and the northern mulgara (D. wolleyae), which were split from D. cristicauda. As a result of the taxonomic changes to this taxon, it is believed that D. cristicauda is now only known from subfossil specimens and the single live caught holotype specimen.

Kreft, 1867, first described the species as 'Chaetocercus cristicauda' in 1877 based on a single specimen collected from southern Australia.
