= Ornithological Society of New Zealand =

New Zealand ornithological research organisation

Birds New Zealand
- Formation: 24 May 1940; 86 years ago
- Type: Non-profit
- Purpose: Ornithological research
- Location: New Zealand
- Website: www.birdsnz.org.nz

The Ornithological Society of New Zealand (OSNZ), also known as Birds New Zealand and BirdsNZ, is a non-profit organisation dedicated to the study of birds and their habitats in the New Zealand region. Founded in 1940, it caters to a wide variety of people interested in the birds of the region, from professional ornithologists to casual birdwatchers.

The Society publishes a quarterly peer-reviewed scientific journal, Notornis, and a quarterly news magazine, Birds New Zealand (formerly Southern Bird). It also organises membership-based scientific projects, such as the Atlas of Bird Distribution in New Zealand.

== History ==
Following preliminary discussions in 1938 and 1939, the Society was formally established at an inaugural general meeting chaired by Robert Falla at Canterbury Museum on 24 May 1940. It became an incorporated body in January 1953.

== Aims ==
The aims of the OSNZ are to:

- encourage, organise and promote the study of birds and their habitat use, particularly within the New Zealand region.
- foster and support the wider knowledge and enjoyment of birds generally.
- promote the recording and wide circulation of the results of bird studies and observations.
- produce a journal and other publication containing matters of ornithological interest.
- effect co-operation and exchange of information with other organisations with similar aims and objectives.
- assist the conservation and management of birds by providing information from which sound management decisions can be derived.
- maintain a library of ornithological literature for the use of members and to promote a wider knowledge of birds.
- promote the archiving of observations, studies and records of birds, particularly in the New Zealand region.
- carry out any other activity which is capable of being conveniently carried out in connection with the above objects, or which directly or indirectly advances those objects or any of them.

== Publications ==
Notornis
- Discipline: Ornithology
- Language: English
- Edited by: Craig Symes

Publication details
- Former name: New Zealand Bird Notes
- History: 1943–present
- Publisher: Ornithological Society of New Zealand
- Frequency: Quarterly

Standard abbreviations
- ISO 4: Notornis

Indexing
- CODEN: NTNSAN
- ISSN: 0029-4470
- LCCN: 67050854

Links
- Journal homepage; Current issue

Notornis is a quarterly peer-reviewed scientific journal that focuses on bird-based research in New Zealand and the South Pacific. It has been published since 1943.

The Ornithological Society publishes the Checklist of the Birds of New Zealand. The first edition was published in 1953 and the fifth edition in 2022.

== New Zealand Bird Atlas ==
The society oversees the New Zealand Bird Atlas, a citizen science project using observers all over the country to record the presence of birds. The project to undertake the fourth update of the bird atlas was launched at the society's 2019 annual conference.

== Annual conference ==
The society holds an annual conference that provides an opportunity for amateur and professional ornithologists to meet and present recent research findings. The conference programme typically includes field trips.

== Award ==
The society grants the Robert Falla Memorial Award to people "who have made a significant contribution to both the Ornithological Society of New Zealand and to New Zealand ornithology".

== Notable members ==
- Robert Falla, founding president
- Brian Douglas Bell, former president
- Kerry-Jayne Wilson, former vice-president
- Geoffrey Armstrong Buddle, founding member
- Graham Turbott, founding member
