= 1947 Snares Islands expedition =

Expedition to the Snares Islands in 1947

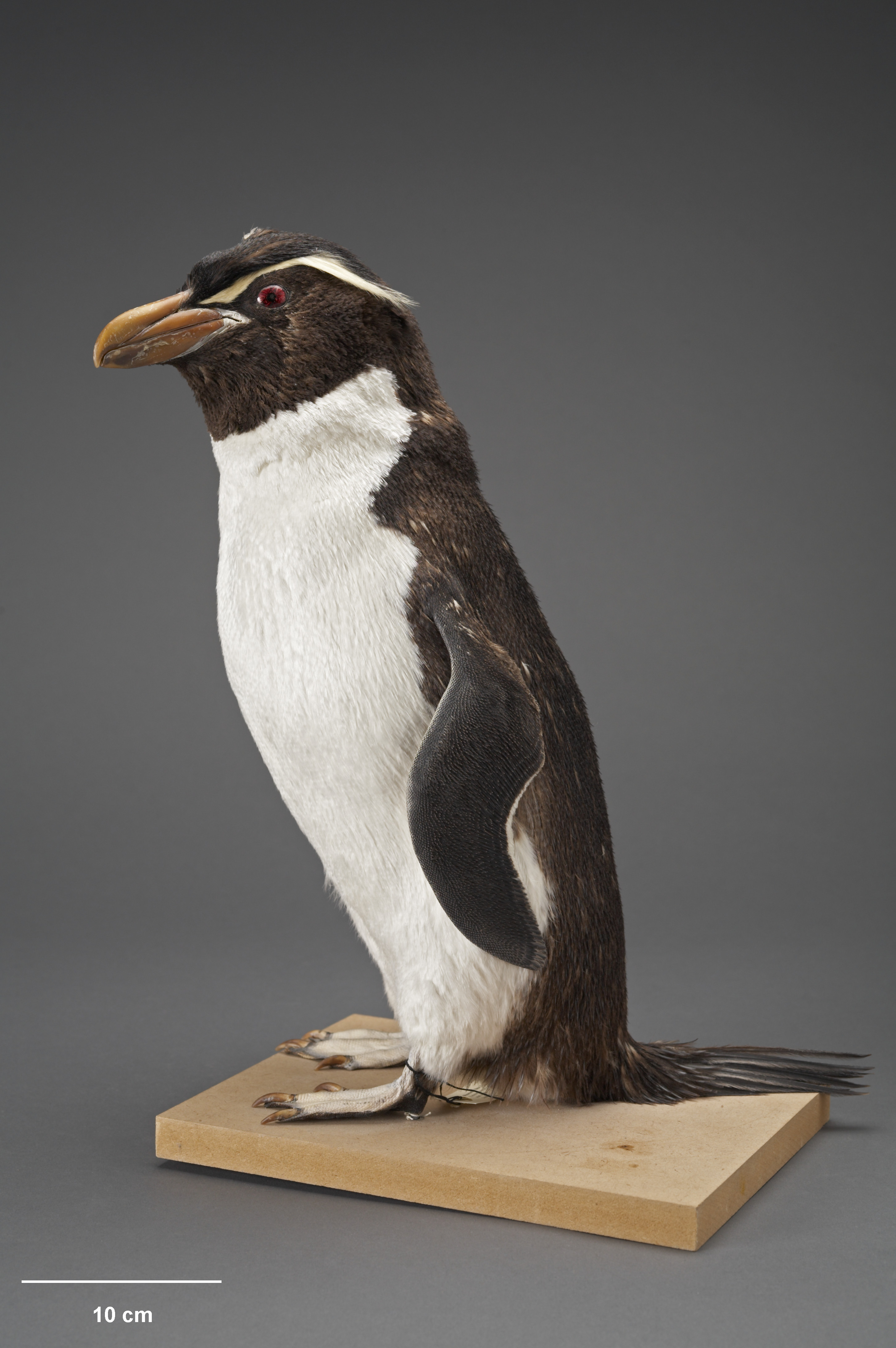
- Country: New Zealand
- Location: Snares Islands
- Country of origin: New Zealand
- Start: 21 November 1947
- End: 8 December 1947
- Leader: Robert Falla
- Organiser: Robert Falla
- Funder: New Zealand Government; American Museum of Natural History
- Participants: Robert Falla; Robert Cushman Murphy; Robert Adams Wilson; Frank Lawrence Newcombe; Charles Alexander Fleming; Edgar Stead

The 1947 Snares Islands expedition was an expedition undertaken between November 1947 and December 1947 to research the birds and other biodiversity of the Snares Islands.

== Purpose of the expedition ==
The expedition set out to collect specimens to be exhibited at the American Museum of Natural History. It would also focus on researching seabirds in the Snares Islands.

== Voyage ==
The expedition departed Bluff aboard the launch Alert, captained by Captain A. J. Black, on 21 November 1947. It travelled to Half Moon Bay and Port Pegasus, where bad weather kept it ashore for two days, before landing at Snares Island on 24 November.

== Participants ==
- R. A. Falla, Dominion Museum, expedition leader and organiser
- Robert Cushman Murphy, American Museum of Natural History
- Grace Emeline Barstow Murphy
- E. F. Stead
- R. A. Wilson
- F. L. Newcombe
- C. A. Fleming
- P. F. Carter
- A. J. Black, captain of Alert
