= Allen Curnow =

New Zealand poet and journalist

Allen Curnow ONZ CBE
- Born: Thomas Allen Monro Curnow; 17 June 1911; Timaru, New Zealand
- Died: 23 September 2001 (aged 90)
- Education: Christchurch Boys' High School; Canterbury University College; Auckland University College
- Occupations: Journalist, poet
- Years active: 1929–2001
- Employer(s): Christchurch Sun (1929–1930); St John's Theological College (1931–1933); The Press (1937–1988); The New Zealand Herald (1951–1988)
- Notable work: Continuum: New and Later Poems 1972–1988
- Spouse(s): Betty Curnow (m. 1936; div. 1965) Jenifer Curnow
- Awards: See awards.

Thomas Allen Monro Curnow ONZ CBE (17 June 1911 – 23 September 2001) was a New Zealand poet and journalist.

== Life ==
Curnow was born in Timaru, New Zealand, the son of a fourth generation New Zealander, an Anglican clergyman, and he grew up in a religious family. The family was of Cornish origin. During his early childhood they often moved around Canterbury, living in Belfast, Malvern, Lyttelton and New Brighton. He was educated at Christchurch Boys' High School, Canterbury University, and obtained a PhD from Auckland University in 1964.

After completing his education, Curnow worked from 1929 to 1930 at the Christchurch Sun, before moving once again to Auckland to prepare for the Anglican ministry at St John's Theological College (1931–1933). In this period Curnow also published his first poems in University periodicals, such as Kiwi and Phoenix.

In 1934 Curnow returned to the South Island, where he started a correspondence with Iris Wilkinson and Alan Mulgan, as well as finding a job at The Press, the Christchurch morning daily newspaper, having decided against a career in the Anglican ministry. At the same time, he also started a lifelong friendship with Denis Glover and contributed to the Caxton Press, submitting some of his poems. He then taught English at Auckland University from 1950 to 1976, during which he spent much time at his holiday home on Lone Kauri Road in the central Waitākere Ranges. The ranges and Karekare Beach became major features of his later work.

== Personal life ==
Curnow married Elizabeth "Betty" Le Cren at St Mary's Church, Timaru, on 26 August 1936. The marriage was dissolved in 1965, but they had a daughter and two sons, one of whom is New Zealand poet and art critic Wystan Curnow. His second marriage was to Jenifer Curnow (née Tole), a librarian and scholar of Māori culture. He was buried at Purewa Cemetery in the Auckland suburb of Meadowbank.

== Career ==
Curnow wrote a long-running weekly satirical poetry column under the pen-name of Whim Wham for his series of publications such as The Press starting in 1931 and The New Zealand Herald published from 1951-1988 – a period in which he turned his perspective and knowledge of many world issues, from Franco, Hitler, Vietnam, Apartheid, and the White Australia policy, to the internal politics of Walter Nash, the eras of Robert Muldoon and David Lange. Interspersed with humorous commentary on light-hearted subjects such as New Zealand's affinity towards rugby.

Curnow's publication Book of New Zealand Verse (1945) is seen as a landmark in New Zealand literature. He is, however, more celebrated as poet than as a satirist. His poetic works are heavily influenced by his training for the Anglican ministry, and subsequent rejection of that calling, with Christian imagery, myth and symbolism being included frequently, particularly in his early works (such as 'Valley of Decision'). He draws consistently on his experiences in childhood to shape a number of his poems, reflecting perhaps a childlike engagement with the environment in which he grew up, these poems bringing the hopeful, curious, questioning voice that a childlike view entails. Curnow's work of course is not all so innocently reflective. The satirist in Curnow is certainly not pushed aside in his poetic works, but is explored instead with a greater degree of emotional connectivity and self-reflection.

Curnow's works concerning the New Zealand landscape and the sense of isolation experienced by one who lives in an island colony are perhaps his most moving and most deeply pertinent works regarding the New Zealand condition. His landscape/isolation centred poetry reflects varying degrees of engaged fear, guilt, accusation, rage and possessiveness, creating an important but, both previously and still, much neglected dialogue with the New Zealand landscape. He positions himself as an outside critic (he was far less religiously and politically involved than contemporaries like James K. Baxter, and far more conventional in his lifestyle also) and though perhaps less impassioned in his writing than his contemporaries, his poetic works are both prophetic and intelligent.

=== Honours and awards ===
- In the 1986 Queen's Birthday Honours, Curnow was appointed Commander of the Order of the British Empire, for services to literature.
- Queen's Gold Medal for Poetry, 1989
- On 6 February 1990, Curnow was the fourteenth appointee to The Order of New Zealand.
- New Zealand 1990 Commemoration Medal
- New Zealand Book Award for Poetry; 1958, 1963, 1975, 1980, 1983, 1987, 2001
- Commonwealth Poetry Prize 1988 (for Continuum)
- Cholmondeley Award, 1992 (other winners that year: Donald Davie, Carol Ann Duffy, and Roger Woddis)
- A W Reed Lifetime Achievement Award, 2000

=== Bibliography ===
- 1933: Valley of Decision : Poems. Auckland : Auckland University College Students' Association Press
- 1933: Another Argo: three poems from the Caxton Club Press (including "Doom at sunrise"), Christchurch: Caxton Club Press
- 1935: Three poems: Aspect of Monism, Restraint, The Wilderness, Christchurch: Caxton Club Press
- 1935: Poetry and Language, Christchurch: Caxton Club Press
- 1937: Enemies : Poems 1934–36, Christchurch: Caxton Press,1937
- 1939: Not in Narrow Seas : Poems with Prose, Christchurch: Caxton Press
- 1940: Present for Hitler and Other Verses, Christchurch: Caxton Press
- 1941: Recent Poems. By Allen Curnow, A. R. D. Fairburn, Denis Glover, R. A. K. Mason, Christchurch: Caxton Press
- 1941: Island and Time, Christchurch: Caxton Press
- 1942: Landfall in Unknown Seas, poem with music by Douglas Lilburn
- 1942: Whim-Wham. Verses, 1941–42, Christchurch: Caxton Press
- 1943: Whim-Wham. Verses, 1943, Wellington: Progressive Publishing Society
- Circa 1946 (year uncertain): Sailing or Drowning: Poems, Wellington: Progressive Publishing Society
- 1946: Jack Without Magic: Poems, Christchurch: Caxton Press
- 1949: At Dead Low Water, and Sonnets, Christchurch: Caxton Press
- 1949: The Axe: a Verse Tragedy, Christchurch: Caxton Press, 1949 [i.e. 1950]
- 1957: Poems 1949–57, Wellington: Mermaid Press
- Circa 1957 (year uncertain): The Hucksters and the University : or, Out of Site, Out of Mind; or Up Queen Street Without a Paddle. A happy little poem for all the family ... read by the author at a public poetry reading in the Auckland City Art Gallery on 24 May 1957, Auckland: Pilgrim Press (broadsheet)
- 1957: Mr Huckster of 1958 : another and still happier little poem..., Auckland: Pilgrim Press (broadsheet)
- 1958: Bright Sky, verse play, unpublished, cyclostyled copy held in University of Auckland Library, NZ Glass Case
- 1959: Best of Whim-Wham, Hamilton: Paul's Book Arcade
- 1959: Moon Section, unpublished play, performed 1959
- 1960: On the Tour : Verwoerd Be Our Vaatchwoerd..., Auckland: Pilgrim Press (broadsheet)
- 1961: The Overseas Expert, unpublished playscript in University of Auckland Library, New Zealand Glass Case
- 1962: A Small Room With Large Windows, London: Oxford University Press
- 1967: Whim Wham Land, Auckland: B. & J. Paul
- 1972: Four Plays, Wellington: A.W. and A.H. Reed, (Contains: The Axe, The Overseas Expert, The Duke's Miracle, Resident of Nowhere)
- 1972: Trees, Effigies, Moving Objects: a Sequence, Wellington: Catspaw Press
- 1973: An Abominable Temper, and Other Poems, Wellington: Catspaw Press
- 1974: Collected Poems 1933–1973, Wellington: A.W. and A.H. Reed
- 1979: An Incorrigible Music, Dunedin: Auckland University Press
- 1982: Editor, Allen Curnow Selected Poems, Auckland: Penguin
- 1982: You Will Know When You Get There: Poems 1979, Auckland: Auckland University Press
- 1986: The Loop in Lone Kauri Road, Auckland: Auckland University Press
- 1987: Look Back Harder: Critical Writings 1935–1984, edited with an introduction by Peter Simpson, Auckland: Auckland University Press
- 1988: Continuum: New and Later Poems 1972–1988, Auckland: Auckland University Press
- 1990: Selected Poems 1940–1989, London: Viking
- 1994: Looking West, Late Afternoon, Low Water, Limited edition, designed and made by Alan Loney in collaboration with Elizabeth Serjeant, Auckland: Holloway Press
- Penguin Modern Poets 7, second series (1996) with Donald Davie and Samuel Menashe
- 1996: The Scrap-book; limited edition published in conjunction with Writers' and Readers' Week, 12–17 Mar 1996, Wellington: Wai-te-ata Press
- 1997: Early Days Yet : New and Collected Poems 1941–1997, Auckland: Auckland University Press
- 2001: The Bells of Saint Babel's: poems 1997–2001, Auckland: Auckland University Press
- 2005: Whim Wham's New Zealand: The Best of Whim Wham 1937–1988, edited by Terry Sturm

=== Edited ===
- 1945: Book of New Zealand Verse 1923–45, Christchurch: Caxton Press
- 1951: Book of New Zealand Verse 1923–50, Christchurch: Caxton Press
- 1960: Penguin Book of New Zealand Verse, Harmondsworth: Penguin Books

=== Documentary ===
Curnow was the subject of the 2001 documentary Early Days Yet, directed by Shirley Horrocks. Filmed in the final months of Curnow's life, it records him talking about his life and work, and visiting the setting of some of his important poems.
