= Southern mulgara =

Conservation status
- Extinct (IUCN 3.1)

Scientific classification
- Kingdom: Animalia
- Phylum: Chordata
- Class: Mammalia
- Infraclass: Marsupialia
- Order: Dasyuromorphia
- Family: Dasyuridae
- Genus: Dasycercus
- Species: †D. archeri

Binomial name
- †Dasycercus archeri Newman-Martin & Travouillon, 2023

Extinct species of marsupial

The southern mulgara (Dasycercus archeri) is an extinct species of mulgara formally described in 2023. The species is named after Australian palaeontologist Michael Archer, who contributed to many Australian palaeontological and mammalian discoveries. It was last seen in 1925 and declared extinct by the IUCN in 2026.

== Description ==
The species was very similar to the crest-tailed mulgara (Dasycercus cristicauda), but differed in the morphology of its dentition. Externally, the southern mulgara had a crested tail and 8 nipples, which had been previously used to differentiate the crest-tailed mulgara (D. cristicauda) and the brush-tailed mulgara (D. blythi).

== Distribution ==
Based on subfossil remains and preserved museum specimens, it is believed that the Southern mulgara occurred commonly throughout the Nullarbor Plain, and Great Victoria Desert, through to the caves of the northern Swan coastal Plain.
