= Northern mulgara =

Conservation status
- Extinct (IUCN 3.1)

Scientific classification
- Kingdom: Animalia
- Phylum: Chordata
- Class: Mammalia
- Infraclass: Marsupialia
- Order: Dasyuromorphia
- Family: Dasyuridae
- Genus: Dasycercus
- Species: †D. woolleyae

Binomial name
- †Dasycercus woolleyae Newman-Martin & Travouillon, 2023

Extinct species of marsupial

The northern mulgara (Dasycercus woolleyae) is an extinct species of mulgara that was first described in 2023. The species is named after Dr. Patricia Woolley who previously worked on the genus Dasycercus, and has worked extensively with Australian dasyurids. It was last seen in 1962 and declared extinct by the IUCN in 2026.

== Description ==
The northern mulgara was externally very similar to the brush-tailed mulgara, with some individuals displaying the signature brushed tail. However, some individuals of the northern mulgara had also been observed with a crested tail, indicating that the character is polymorphic.

== Distribution ==
Museum specimens of the northern mulgara have been collected in the Tanami Desert, Simpson Desert, Gibson Desert, and Great Sandy Desert. A large collection of specimens are from the Otto Lipfert Canning Stock Route expeditions in 1930-1931. Here the northern mulgara (at the time believed to be the crest-tailed mulgara) and the brush-tailed mulgara were observed living in sympatry, with the northern mulgara living in dune crests.
