= Geoffrey Armstrong Buddle =

New Zealand naturalist and civil engineer

Geoffrey Armstrong Buddle DSO, MC
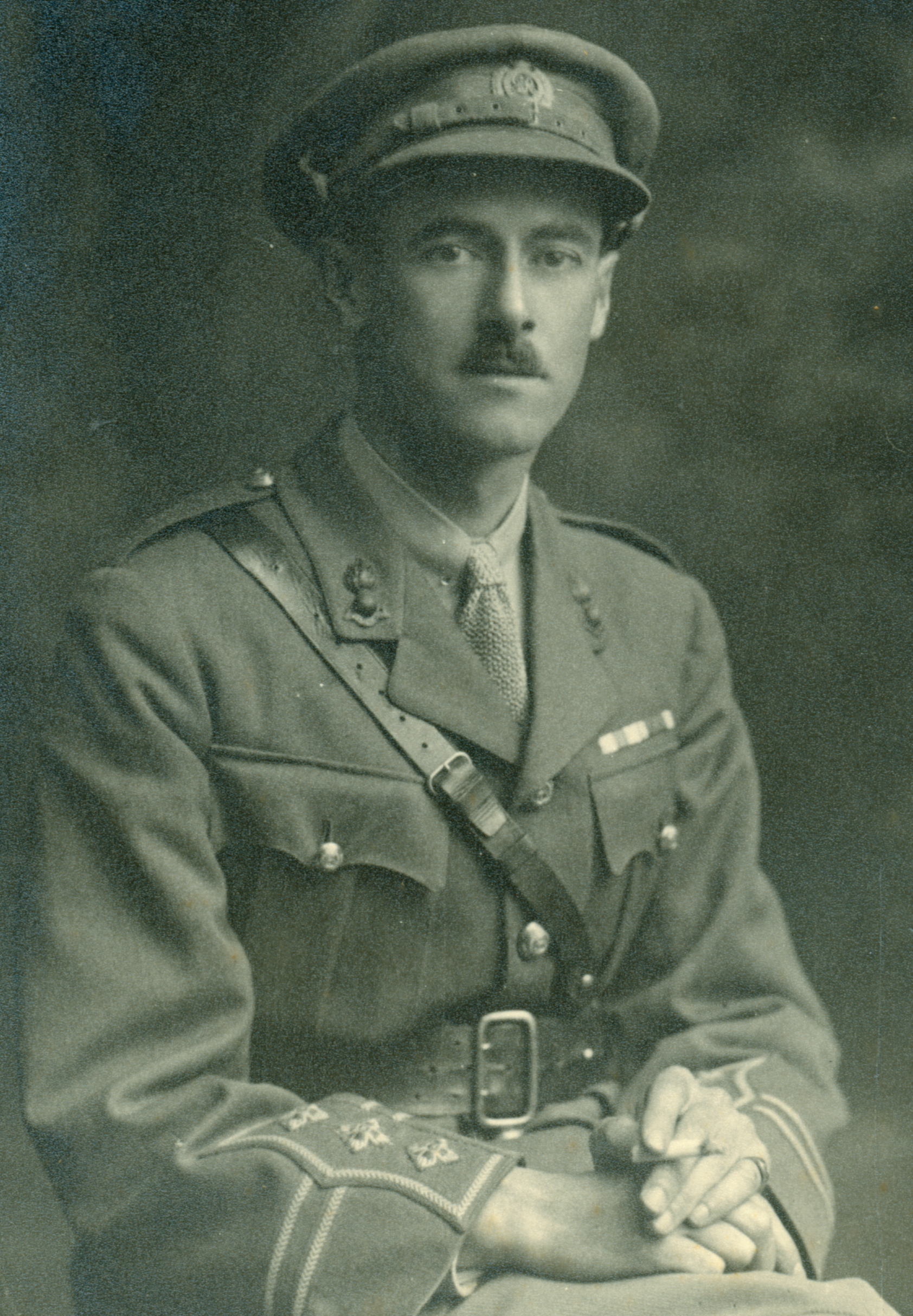
- Buddle in uniform
- Born: 16 September 1887; Auckland, New Zealand
- Died: 9 June 1951 (Aged 63)
- Military career
- Allegiance: United Kingdom
- Branch: British Army
- Service years: 1915–1926
- Rank: Major
- Unit: Royal Engineers (86 Field Company)
- Conflicts: World War I; Gallipoli campaign; Western Front
- Awards: Distinguished Service Order; Military Cross
- Other work: Ornithologist; photographer

Major Geoffrey Armstrong Buddle DSO, MC (16 September 1887 – 9 June 1951) was a New Zealand naturalist, ornithologist, and civil engineer, and a founding member of the Ornithological Society of New Zealand. He was the grandson of the early Methodist missionary Thomas Buddle.

== Ornithological specimen collection ==
Buddle built a scientific collection between 1890 and the 1940s consisting of 461 eggs and 41 other assorted items, and gave it to the Auckland War Memorial Museum in stages between 1931 and 1951. The collection contains specimens from the Subantarctic, mainland New Zealand, Stewart Island, Kermadec Islands, and Kanton Island (part of the Phoenix Islands in the Republic of Kiribati). Because of its size and scope, the collection provides important historical breeding records of birds, and is rated one of the most important bird collections in that museum.

== War service ==
After graduating from the University of California, Berkeley, Buddle was working in England as an engineer at the outbreak of World War I. He joined the Royal Engineers, taking part in the Gallipoli Campaign and travelling to the Western Front (the Somme and Arras).

He was awarded a DSO "for distinguished service in connection with military operations in France and Flanders" (awarded for bridge-building under fire). He was seriously gassed, which led to long-term health problems.

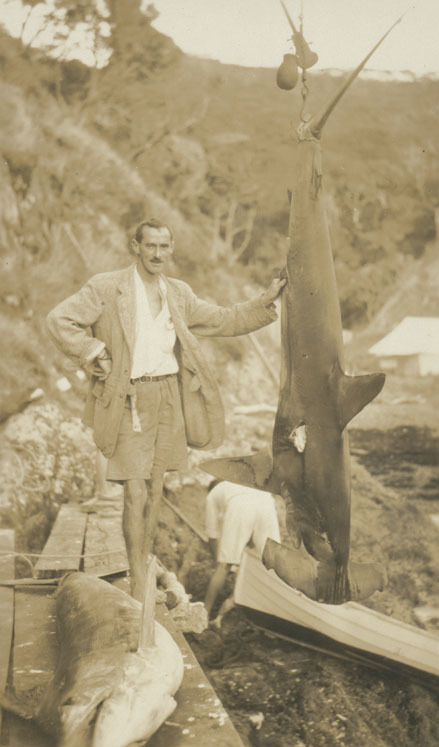
Buddle in the 1930s

== Curatorial work ==
Buddle was Acting Ornithologist at Auckland Museum while the curator was away on war service between 1943 and 1945. Buddle continued as Associate Ornithologist from 1945 until his death. His notebook, diary, correspondence and photographic collection are held by the museum. He also took part in the solar-eclipse expedition to Canton Island on 8 June 1937, on which he collected specimens for the museum (among them invertebrates and birds).

== Publications ==
- Buddle, Geoffrey Armstrong (1938). "Notes on the Birds of Canton Island". Records of the Auckland Institute and Museum. 2: 125–132. JSTOR 42905974. Wikidata Q58676597.
- 1939 Some notes on the breeding habits of the dabchick. Emu 39: 77–84.
- 1941 Birds of the Poor Knights. Emu 41: 56–68.
- 1941 Photographing the spotless crake. Emu 41: 130–134.
- 1946 A second visit to the Poor Knights. Emu 45: 315–318.
- 1947 Notes on the birds of Mokohinau. New Zealand Bird Notes 2: 69–70.
- 1947 Breeding of the red-billed gull. New Zealand Bird Notes 2: 71–72.
- 1947 Contributions to the gannet census. VII. New gannetry off Karaka Point. VIII. Gannets of the Three Kings. New Zealand Bird Notes 2: 128–130.
- 1948 Contributions to the gannet census. XII. Gannetries north of Auckland, season 1947–48. New Zealand Bird Notes 3: 40–42.
- Buddle, Geoffrey Armstrong (1948). "The Outlying Islands of the Three Kings Group". Records of the Auckland Institute and Museum. 3: 195–204. JSTOR 42906010. Wikidata Q58676653.
- 1949 Birds of Three Kings and neighbouring waters. New Zealand Bird Notes 3: 147–150.
- 1951 Bird Secrets. Reed, Wellington.
