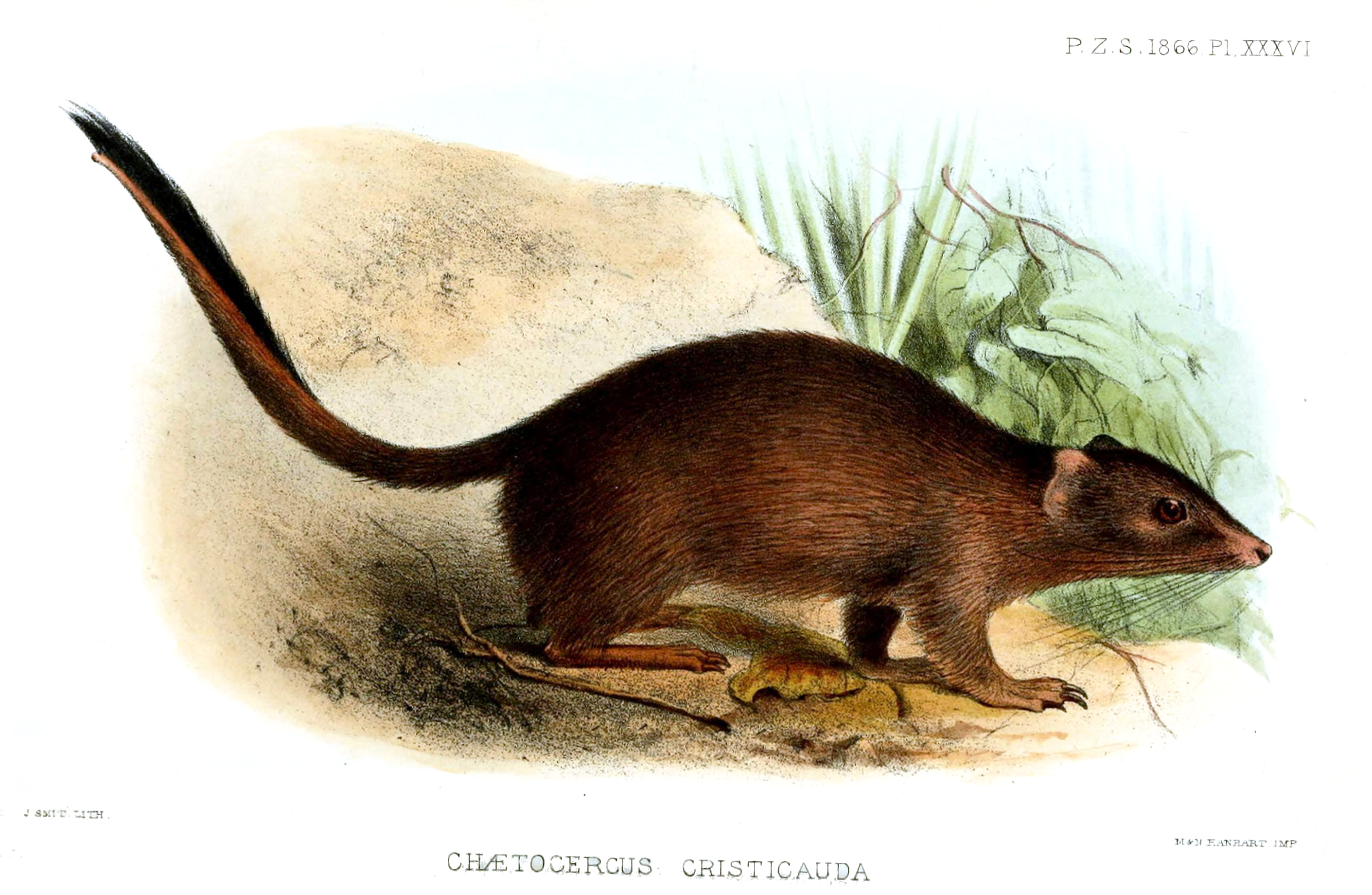
- Crest-tailed mulgara (Dasycercus cristicauda)

Scientific classification
- Kingdom: Animalia
- Phylum: Chordata
- Class: Mammalia
- Infraclass: Marsupialia
- Order: Dasyuromorphia
- Family: Dasyuridae
- Subfamily: Dasyurinae
- Tribe: Dasyurini
- Genus: Dasycercus; Peters, 1875

Type species
- 'Chaetocercus' cristicauda Krefft, 1867

Species
- †D. archeri; D. blythi; D. hillieri; †D. cristicauda; †D. marlowi; †D. woolleyae

= Mulgara =

Mulgaras

Genus of marsupials

Mulgara are small rat-sized species in the genus Dasycercus. They are marsupial carnivores, related to the Tasmanian devil and quolls, that live in deserts and spinifex grasslands of the Australian arid and semi-arid zones. They are nocturnal carnivores which feed on smaller animals.

The generic name Dasycercus means "hairy tail".

== Taxonomy and species identification ==
Typically, two distinct but very similar species of mulgara have been recognized: the brush-tailed mulgara (D. blythi) and the crest-tailed mulgara or ampurta (D. hillieri, recently resurrected from synonymy with D. cristicauda). The brush-tailed mulgara has a relatively uncrested tail, two upper premolars, and six nipples. The crest-tailed mulgara has a crested tail, three upper premolars, and eight nipples. The most distinguishing feature in identifying the two extant species is the crest of hair on the tail. The crest-tailed mulgara has a crest of long black hairs on the upper side of the distal end of the tail, although this feature may be present in D. cristicauda, D. archeri, D. hillieri and D. woolleyae. The brush-tailed mulgara has a brush of black hairs along the final two-thirds of the tail, though this is now no longer considered a unique feature. The species also have a slightly different dental formation, which is difficult to observe in live animals.

Three additional species have been described more recently: the southern mulgara (D. archeri), the little mulgara (D. marlowi), and the northern mulgara (D. woolleyae); these are only known from subfossil remains.

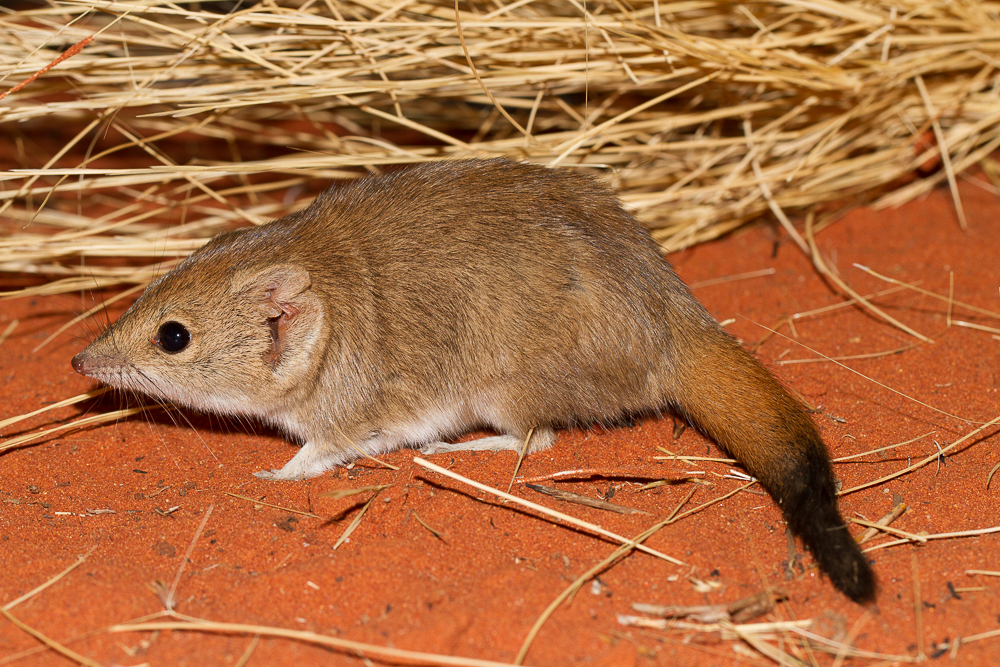
Mulgara in its natural habitat.

A long history of confusion exists when classifying mulgaras, and the three recently described species cannot be genetically analyzed, making the confirmation of taxonomy difficult. Recent genetic analysis of most available and well-preserved tissue samples from around Australia suggests that only two species of mulgara are extant, and that these species conform well to the currently named D. blythi and D. hillieri. The question remains as to why some widely co-occurring and similarly-sized Dasycercus species would have gone extinct, since European colonisation, but others (i.e. the brush-tailed mulgara) have remained relatively common.

== Distribution ==
Mulgara are distributed through the arid regions of Australia, with the crest-tailed mulgara currently being restricted to the central eastern deserts (Simpson-Strzelecki Dunefield bioregion) of the continent, and the brush-tailed mulgara being more widespread from Queensland to near-coastal Western Australia.

== Biology ==
Mulgaras are nocturnal, but occasionally "sunbathe" in the entrance of the burrow in which they dwell. Their kidneys are highly developed to excrete extremely concentrated urine to preserve water, as the animals rarely drink.

Mulgara feed mostly on insects, but also eat reptiles and small mammals. Mulgara are seasonal breeders and breed from June to September. The pouch comprises two lateral folds of skin.

All species of mulgaras undergo torpor daily. Studies have shown they use torpor in the wild and in the lab setting. In contrast to most other mammals, mulgaras increase their use of torpor during pregnancy. By conserving energy with torpor, pregnant females can increase their body mass, but it seems they use it to increase fat storage, for lactation later. Pregnant females and breeding males both use torpor during the winter. Free-ranging males, however, only display torpor briefly during the reproductive season, and instead increase their use of torpor after the breeding season is over.

== Conservation status ==
The crest-tailed mulgara is listed as vulnerable. It appears that the geographic range of this species has contracted since European colonisation, although the south-eastern edge of the species distribution appears to currently be in a phase of expansion. This may be related to the boom-bust dynamics of the Australian deserts, or a response to some other driver of population growth.

Demographic inference from genomic data on the brush-tailed mulgara suggests highly stable population sizes for all populations of that species, over much of the past 1000 years. While there is some evidence of very recent (last 50 to 100 years) population size declines in some populations, particularly in the eastern population, the overall trajectory for much of the last 350 years in all populations appears to have been stable.

== See also ==
- Angas Downs Indigenous Protected Area
