= Kerry-Jayne Wilson =

New Zealand biologist (1949–2022)

Kerry-Jayne Wilson MNZM
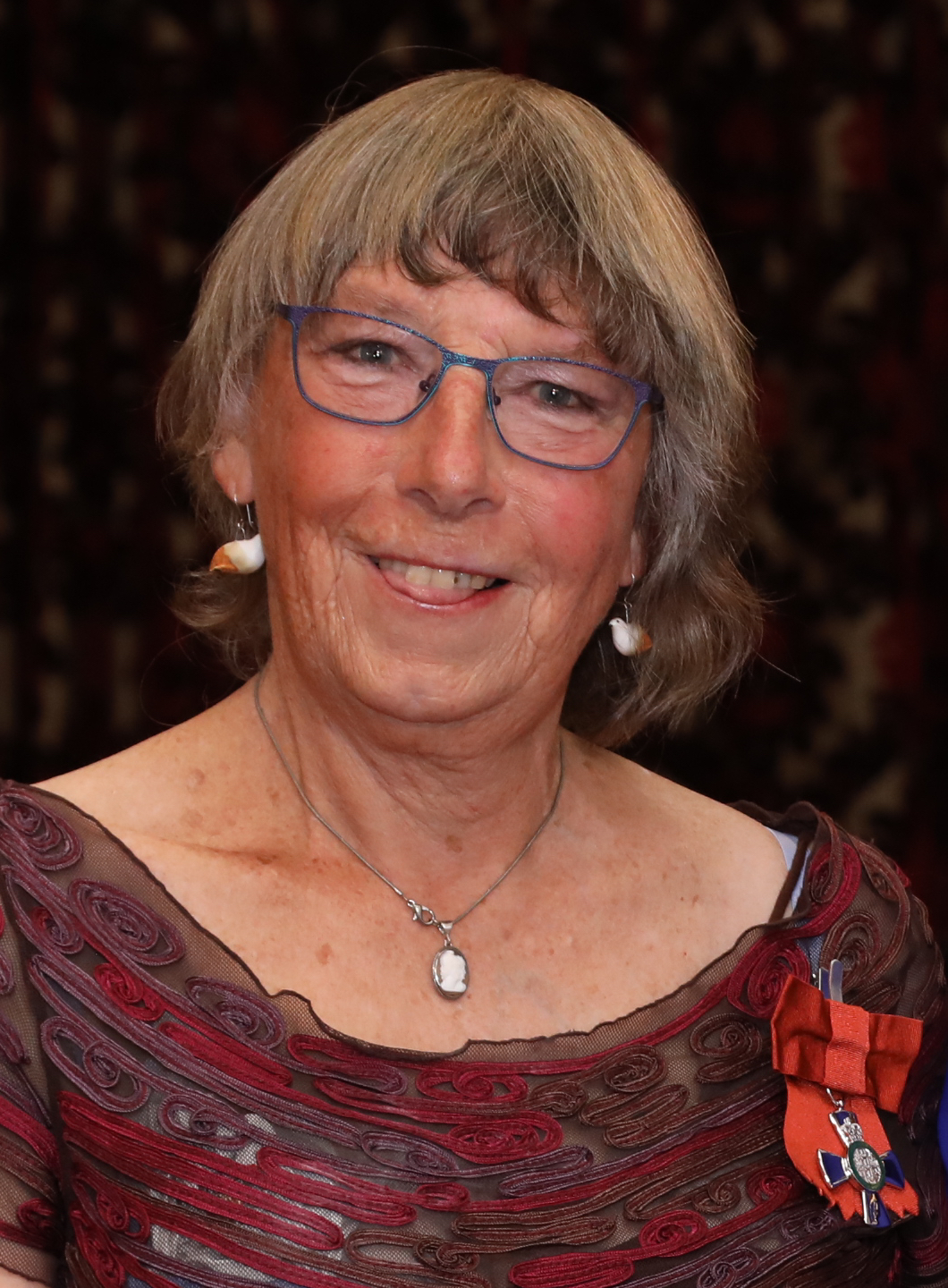
- Wilson in 2019
- Born: 6 March 1949
- Died: 29 March 2022 (aged 73)
- Occupation: Biologist / Ecologist – seabird specialist
- Employer: Lincoln University
- Awards: Robert Falla Memorial Award (2012)

Kerry-Jayne Wilson MNZM (6 March 1949 – 29 March 2022) was a New Zealand biologist and lecturer in ecology at Lincoln University in the Faculty of Agriculture and Life Sciences.

== Work ==
As an undergraduate, Wilson spent the summer of 1969–1970 in the Snares Islands, working as an assistant to the Australian ornithologist and photographer John Warham. She was struck by the huge numbers of sooty shearwaters (Puffinus griseus), penguins, petrels, and prions, and seabirds later became her research focus.

Wilson participated in the 1972–1973 Auckland Islands Expedition as a biologist.

She earned a Master of Science degree at the University of Canterbury, and was appointed a faculty member at Lincoln College (now Lincoln University) in 1986.

Wilson worked for over 40 years on different conservation projects in New Zealand, with a focus on its avifauna. Most of her field research on seabirds was conducted in New Zealand, the Chathams, the sub-Antarctic Islands, and Antarctica, but she also worked in Mongolia, Malaysia, Newfoundland, Indonesia and the Cook Islands. One of her research projects was on the endangered Chatham petrel (Pterodroma axillaris), where she helped develop a burrow entrance flap that prevented broad-billed prions (Pachyptila vittata) from invading Chatham petrel nesting burrows and disturbing their chicks.

She was New Zealand committee member of the Australasian Seabird Group, was vice-president of the Ornithological Society of New Zealand (OSNZ), and edited the State of New Zealand Birds Report. She lectured at the University of Göttingen on ecology and wildlife conservation in New Zealand.

Wilson started teaching at Lincoln University in the entomology department as a lecturer in 1986 under her male birth name. (Note: In the 1989 Lincoln College Calendar, Wilson last appears under her male birth name. In the 1990 Lincoln University Calendar, compiled on 1 October 1989, she first appears as Kerry-Jayne Wilson.) After teaching ecology for 23 years, Wilson retired to Charleston on the West Coast of the South Island in 2009. She continued to be involved in conservation projects, and was a founding trustee of the West Coast Penguin Trust in 2006. Her work with the Trust led to the construction in 2014 of a three-kilometre (1.9 mi) fence along State Highway 6, which prevented blue penguins from being killed on the road. She was involved with the conservation of the Westland petrel (Procellaria westlandica) colony near Punakaiki, including strategies to protect petrel fledglings from being disoriented and confused by street lights.

In 2021, Wilson published New Zealand Seabirds, a summary of her 50 years of research. She died on 29 March 2022.

== Awards and honours ==
In 2012, Wilson was awarded the OSNZ's Robert Falla Memorial Award for her "work... in the field of ornithology and her contributions to the work of the society over many years".

In the 2019 New Year Honours, Wilson was appointed a Member of the New Zealand Order of Merit, for services to seabird conservation.

In 2023, the fossil penguin species Eudyptula wilsonae was named after her.

== Publications ==
Wilson published 70 scientific papers and three books. Among her most important works is Flight of the Huia, a book that deals with the issue of species conservation in New Zealand.

- — (2004). Flight of the Huia: ecology and conservation of New Zealand's frogs, reptiles, birds and mammals. Christchurch: Canterbury University Press. ISBN 978-0908812523.
- — (2007). A Checklist to New Zealand Birds, Frogs, Reptiles, Mammals and Butterflies. Christchurch: Canterbury University Press. ISBN 978-1-877257513.
- — (2013). West Coast Walking: a naturalist's guide to the West Coast. Christchurch: Canterbury University Press. ISBN 978-1-927145-42-5.
- — (2021). New Zealand Seabirds: a natural history. Nelson: Potton & Burton. ISBN 978-1-98-855025-1.
