= Dale Hadley Vitt =

American botanist (born 1944)

Dale Hadley Vitt (born February 9, 1944) is an American bryologist and peatland ecologist, recognized as a leading expert on peatlands. From 1989 to 1991 he was the president of the American Bryological and Lichenological Society.

== Biography ==
Dale Vitt grew up in Washington, Missouri in a financially struggling family due to the death of his father when Dale was eleven years old. After graduating from high school in 1962, he worked for a year at the McDonnell Aircraft Corporation (which was renamed in 1967 McDonnell Douglas) on manufacturing for Project Gemini. In autumn 1963 he matriculated at Southeast Missouri State University and graduated there with B.S. in December 1966. He then matriculated at the University of Michigan and graduated in 1967 with M.S. and in 1970 with Ph.D. His doctoral dissertation, supervised by Howard A. Crum, is entitled "The Family Orthotrichaceae (Musci) in North America, North of Mexico". While still a graduate student, in the winter of 1969–1970 Vitt went on a two-and-a-half month expedition to the New Zealand outlying island named Campbell Island.

At the University of Alberta, Vitt was from 1970 to 1975 an assistant professor, from 1975 to 1980 an associate professor, and from 1980 to 2000 a full professor. He became in 1970 a curator at the University of Alberta's Cryptogamic Herbarium and has continued the curatorial appointment to the present. From 1992 to 2000 he was the director of the Devonian Botanic Garden, now called the University of Alberta Botanic Garden. From 2000 to 2011 at Southern Illinois University, he was a professor and chair of the plant biology program. He retired as professor emeritus in 2011. He was a visiting professor in 1971 at the University of Michigan Biological Station and in 1981 at the University of Minnesota and at the University of New South Wales.

Vitt has collected mosses not only in the United States and Canada, but also in the Canary Islands, Australia, New Zealand, Vanuatu, Fiji, Brazil, Peru, Sweden, Switzerland, the United Kingdom, Jamaica, China, Japan, and Asiatic Russia. He has been a co-collector with Richard Edward Andrus, Diana Gail Horton, and Timo Juhani Koponen. In July 1971 while collecting mosses on Devon Island, Vitt suffered two broken ribs from an encounter with a musk ox. In the winter of 1971–1972 he went to the Auckland Islands on a two-month expedition led by Henry Imshaug. On this expedition Vitt climbed a tree to escape an attack from a sea lion. Vitt also participated in the 1972–1973 Auckland Islands Expedition where he studied mosses on the Auckland Islands.

With Richard Edward Andrus he issued the exsiccata Sphagnotheca Boreali-Americana (1975–?1988). In addition, Vitt edited the series Orthotrichaceae Boreali-Americanae exsiccatae (1980–1992).

Dr. Vitt's interests include ecosystem dynamics, biogeochemistry and paleoecology of peatlands, particularly as related to climatic changes. He also has a continuing interest in all aspects of research related to biosystematics and taxonomy (emphasizing bryophytes), including ecological and systematic studies of mosses in tropical, temperate and arctic areas.

A recognised authority on peatlands, he provided the subject section in the 2008 Encyclopedia of Ecology (edited by S.E. Jorgensen and B. Fath). He has published four books and more than 200 papers over the course of his career, as well as chapters and other articles. He was editor-in-chief of The Bryologist for over ten years from 1994 and has served in editorial positions and on the editorial boards of several other publications.

On September 4, 1966, in Madison, Missouri, he married Sandra Faye Mouser. She served as his office/lab manager and assisted him in organizational and editorial work. They have two sons.

== Selected publications ==
=== Articles ===
- Gressitt, J. L.; Samuelson, G. A.; Vitt, D. H. (1968). "Moss growing on Living Papuan Moss-forest Weevils". Nature. 217 (5130): 765–767. Bibcode:1968Natur.217..765G. doi:10.1038/217765a0. ISSN 0028-0836. S2CID 4276949. This 1968 article is "the first report of insects camouflaging their backsides with bryophytes."
- Vitt, Dale H.; Chee, Wai-Lin (1990). "The relationships of vegetation to surface water chemistry and peat chemistry in fens of Alberta, Canada". Vegetatio. 89 (2): 87–106. doi:10.1007/BF00032163. S2CID 25071105.
- Rochefort, Line; Vitt, Dale H.; Bayley, Suzanne E. (1990). "Growth, Production, and Decomposition Dynamics of Sphagnum under Natural and Experimentally Acidified Conditions". Ecology. 71 (5): 1986–2000. doi:10.2307/1937607. JSTOR 1937607.
- Vitt, Dale H.; Chee, Wai-Lin (1990). "The relationships of vegetation to surface water chemistry and peat chemistry in fens of Alberta, Canada". Vegetatio. 89 (2): 87–106. doi:10.1007/BF00032163. S2CID 25071105.
- Vitt, D. H.; Halsey, Linda A.; Zoltai, Stephen C. (1994). "The bog landforms of continental western Canada in relation to climate and permafrost patterns". Arctic and Alpine Research. 26 (1): 1–13. doi:10.1080/00040851.1994.12003032.
- Vitt, D. H. (1994). "An overview of factors that influence the development of Canadian peatlands". The Memoirs of the Entomological Society of Canada. 126 (S169): 7–20. doi:10.4039/entm126169007-1.
- Halsey, Linda A.; Vitt, Dale H.; Zoltai, Stephen C. (1995). "Disequilibrium response of permafrost in boreal continental western Canada to climate change". Climatic Change. 30 (1): 57–73. Bibcode:1995ClCh...30...57H. doi:10.1007/BF01093225. S2CID 154162870.
- Vitt, Dale H.; Bayley, Suzanne E.; Jin, Tai-Long (1995). "Seasonal variation in water chemistry over a bog-rich fen gradient in Continental Western Canada". Canadian Journal of Fisheries and Aquatic Sciences. 52 (3): 587–606. doi:10.1139/f95-059.
- Kuhry, Peter; Vitt, Dale H. (1996). "Fossil Carbon/Nitrogen Ratios as a Measure of Peat Decomposition". Ecology. 77 (1): 271–275. doi:10.2307/2265676. JSTOR 2265676.
- Vitt, Dale H.; Halsey, Linda A.; Bauer, Ilka E.; Campbell, Celina (2000). "Spatial and temporal trends in carbon storage of peatlands of continental western Canada through the Holocene". Canadian Journal of Earth Sciences. 37 (5): 683–693. doi:10.1139/e99-097.
- Turetsky, Merritt R.; Wieder, R. Kelman; Vitt, Dale H. (2002). "Boreal peatland C fluxes under varying permafrost regimes". Soil Biology and Biochemistry. 34 (7): 907–912. doi:10.1016/S0038-0717(02)00022-6.
- Turetsky, M. R.; Wieder, R. K.; Vitt, D. H.; Evans, R. J.; Scott, K. D. (2007). "The disappearance of relict permafrost in boreal north America: Effects on peatland carbon storage and fluxes". Global Change Biology. 13 (9): 1922–1934. Bibcode:2007GCBio..13.1922T. doi:10.1111/j.1365-2486.2007.01381.x. S2CID 84206753.
- Turetsky, Merritt R.; Crow, Susan E.; Evans, Robert J.; Vitt, Dale H.; Wieder, R. Kelman (2008). "Trade-Offs in Resource Allocation among Moss Species Control Decomposition in Boreal Peatlands". Journal of Ecology. 96 (6): 1297–1305. doi:10.1111/j.1365-2745.2008.01438.x. JSTOR 20143576.

=== Books and monographs ===
- Iwatsuki, Zennoske; Vitt, Dale H.; Gradstein, S. Robbert (1976). Bryological herbaria: a guide to the bryological herbaria of the world. Bryophytorum Bibliotecha. Vol. 8. Vaduz: Published for the International Association of Bryologists [by] J. Cramer.
- Vitt, D. H.; Gradstein, S. R.; Iwatsuki, Z. (1985). Compendium of bryology: a world listing of herbaria, collectors, bryologists, and current research. Bryophytorum bibliotheca. Vol. 30. Braunschweig: Published for the International Association of Bryologists [by] J. Cramer. ISBN 3768214346; vii+355 pages
- Vitt, Dale H.; Marsh, Janet E.; Bovey, Robin B. (1988). Mosses, lichens & ferns of northwest North America. Edmonton, Alta.: Lone Pine; Seattle, Wash. : Univ. of Washington Press. ISBN 0295966661; 296 pages; illustrations (some color). Field guide includes detailed descriptions of 370 species, each illustrated in colour. Covers geographic area from Alaska to southern Oregon, and from the Pacific Ocean to Montana and Saskatchewan
- Johnson, Derek; Goward, Trevor; Vitt, Dale H. (1995). Plants of the western boreal forest & aspen parkland. Edmonton, Alta./Redmond, Wash.: Lone Pine. ISBN 1551050587; 392 pages: illustrations (some color)
- Buck, William R.; Vitt, Dale Hadley; Malcolm, William McLagan (2002). Key to the genera of Australian mosses. Flora of Australia Supplementary Series, No. 14. Canberra: Australian Biological Resources Study.
- Wieder, R. K.; Vitt, D. H., eds. (16 October 2006). Boreal Peatland Ecosystems. Ecological Studies. Vol. 188. Springer Science & Business Media. ISBN 978-3-540-31913-9.
- Vitt, Dale H.; Bhatti, Jagtar S., eds. (2012). Restoration and rec8lamation of boreal ecosystems: attaining sustainable development. Cambridge University Press. ISBN 9781139576826.
