= Jenifer Curnow =

New Zealand librarian and writer (1931–2013)

Jenifer Mary Curnow (née Tole; 2 October 1931 – 21 January 2013) was a New Zealand librarian and writer.

== Early life ==
Curnow was the only daughter of Auckland architect George Tole and his wife Janet Tole (née Clarkson). She grew up in Auckland and attended Baradene College and the University of Auckland. She trained as a high school teacher and taught at various schools including Baradene College, Tamaki College and Westlake Girls High School.

== Writing career ==
In the 1970s Curnow began studying Māori-language manuscripts. She translated much of the written work of Māori scholar and historian Wiremu Maihi Te Rangikaheke, who had been George Grey's informant in his studies of Māori tradition and legend.

=== Publications ===
- Curnow J. Hopa N. K. & McRae J. (2002). Rere atu taku manu! : discovering history language and politics in the Māori-language newspapers. Auckland University Press.
- Curnow J. Hopa N. K. & McRae J. (2006). He pitopito korero no te perehi maori : readings from the Māori-language press. Auckland University Press.

== Personal life ==
Curnow married poet Allen Curnow in 1965. She was stepmother to his three children.
