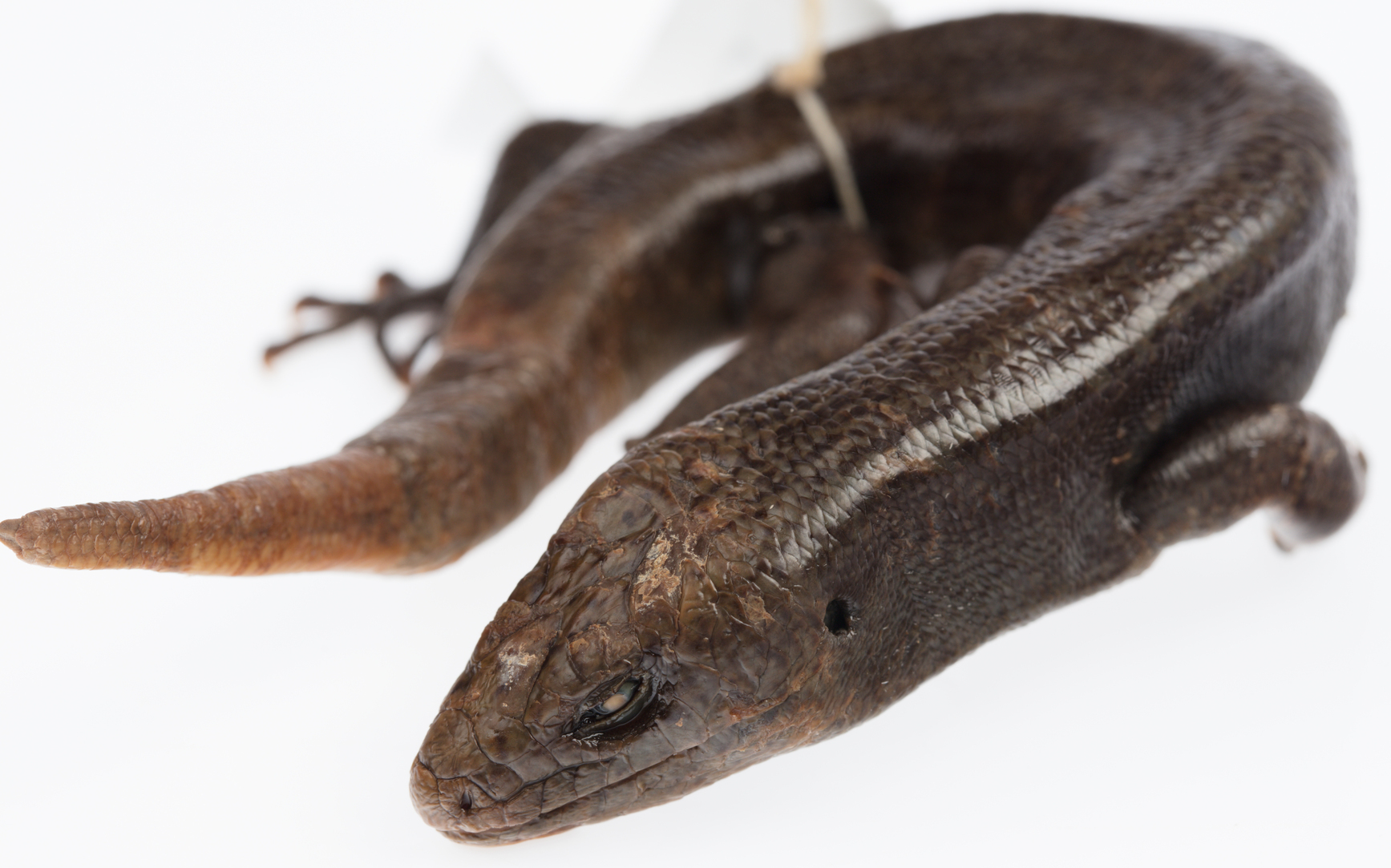
- Type specimen from Auckland War Memorial Museum

Conservation status
- Vulnerable (IUCN 3.1)

Scientific classification
- Kingdom: Animalia
- Phylum: Chordata
- Class: Reptilia
- Order: Squamata
- Family: Scincidae
- Genus: Oligosoma
- Species: O. fallai

Binomial name
- Oligosoma fallai (McCann, 1955)
- Distribution of Falla's skink on a map of the North Island Known native range

Synonyms
- Leiolopisma fallai McCann, 1955; Lygosomella fallai — Wells & Wellington, 1985; Oligosoma fallai — Patterson & Daugherty, 1995

= Falla's skink =

Species of lizard

Falla's skink (Oligosoma fallai), also known commonly as the Three Kings skink, is a species of lizard in the family Scincidae. The species is native to New Zealand.

== Etymology ==
The specific name, fallai, is in honor of New Zealander ornithologist Robert Falla.

== Geographic range ==
O. fallai is endemic to the Three Kings Islands off the coast of New Zealand. It is found nowhere else in the world.

== Habitat ==
The preferred natural habitats of Falla's skink are forest and shrubland.

== Diet ==
O. fallai is omnivorous. It preys upon small invertebrates, and also eats carrion and fruits, including the fruit of the tītoki tree (Alectryon excelsus), the seeds of which it helps to disperse.

== Reproduction ==
O. fallai is ovoviviparous. Young are born in January and February, and mean litter size is 4.5.
