= Basil Marlow =

Australian zoologist

Basil Joseph Guy Marlow
- Born: 1920
- Died: 1993 (aged 72–73)
- Spouse: Judith King
- Scientific career
- Fields: Mammalogy
- Workplaces: Australian Museum

Basil Joseph Guy Marlow (1920 – 1993) was a British born Australian mammalogist who made significant contributions to the study of mammal ecology and behaviour in Australia. He emigrated to Australia in 1954, originally working at the CSIRO. He then worked at the Australian Museum as the head of the Mammal department from 1958 until 1980. He was married to the marine zoologist Judith King.

Marlow participated in the 1972–1973 Auckland Islands Expedition where he studied the New Zealand sea lion on the Auckland Islands.
