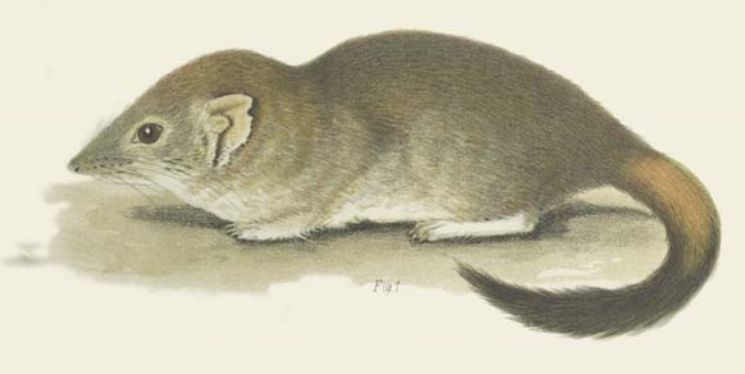
- Dasycercus blythi

Conservation status
- Least Concern (IUCN 3.1)

Scientific classification
- Kingdom: Animalia
- Phylum: Chordata
- Class: Mammalia
- Infraclass: Marsupialia
- Order: Dasyuromorphia
- Family: Dasyuridae
- Genus: Dasycercus
- Species: D. blythi

Binomial name
- Dasycercus blythi (Waite, 1904)
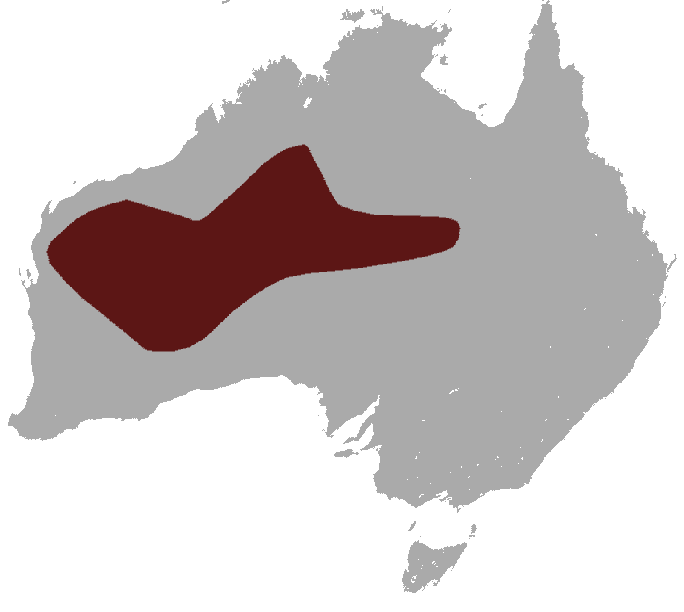
- Brush-tailed mulgara range

= Brush-tailed mulgara =

Species of marsupial

The brush-tailed mulgara (Dasycercus blythi) is a medium sized carnivorous Australian marsupial species. The species is sexually dimorphic with males being much larger than females. Their body length is 12 to 17 cm (4.7 to 6.7 in), and tail length is 6–10 cm (2.4–3.9 in). They store fat in their tail, which at times can be over 16 mm (0.63 in) wide at the base.

The taxonomy of mulgara species has been rather torturous. In 2006, the species names were decided as Dasycercus blythi and D. cristicauda (crest-tailed mulgara). However, a 2023 study decided that the scientific name of the crest-tailed mulgara should be resurrected from synonymy with D. cristicauda back to D. hillieri, and proposed three additional new species of mulgara.

== Physical appearance ==
Dasycercus blythi is a medium sized dasyurid. Female body mass is between 50 g and 90 g, with males weighing between 75 g and 120 g. Their body length is 12 to 17 cm (4.7 to 6.7 in), and tail length is 6–10 cm (2.4–3.9 in). The tail is "of moderate length, shorter than the head and body, thickened in good seasons; the proximal two-fifths covered with short still yellow hairs, the remainder with gradually lengthening black hairs that do not form a crest. The whole of the lower surface is black, with the exception of a small proximal portion which is yellow." The upper portion of fur appears sandy and speckled with brown, while the basal portion appears as a dark grey. The entirety of the under belly, inner side of the limbs, and lining of the pouch are pure white. Dentition shows two premolar teeth in both the upper and lower jaws, with the first observed as smaller than the second in the upper jaw. The most obvious feature that distinguishes D. blythi from D. cristicauda is the sandy colour and the lack of a crest on the tail.

== Habitat and distribution ==
Dasycercus blythi is widely distributed, having been observed during different expeditions in the north-western, central, and south-western areas of the arid zone of Australia. While once widespread and common throughout the central deserts of Australia, a decline has been observed during the 1930s, resulting in a more fragmented distribution than previously observed. Considering the sedentary behavior of D. blythi, their spinifex habitat is considered unusual, as it provides a less stable environment that is prone to wildfire.

Recent genetic analysis of most available and well-preserved tissue samples from around Australia suggests that the crest-tailed mulgara is now restricted to the central eastern deserts (Simpson Strzelecki Dunefields bioregion) of the continent, with the brush-tailed mulgara being more widespread, occurring from Queensland to near-coastal Western Australia.

The Pilbara population of D. blythi is strongly differentiated from other populations and exhibits a stronger pattern of isolation-by-distance, suggesting that there is some demographic isolation between the Pilbara and the sandy deserts that surround it.

== Diet ==
Dasycercus blythi is an opportunistic carnivorous marsupial eating a wide range of invertebrates, frogs, reptiles, and small mammals. Beetles are one of the most common food sources. The dietary flexibility allows this species to persist and may assist individuals in occupying a greater geographic range.

== Population dynamics ==
Populations often occur as scattered with relatively low population densities while still being locally abundant. Populations of D. blythi are unique in that they are sedentary populations rather than highly mobile, something often observed in smaller dasyurid species, whose movements can range up to several kilometers. Populations decline consistently during the winter and spring, possibly due to decreased food during the winter season, reducing available food for potentially pregnant females that would need to feed their young, and reduction of available males due to aggressive competition for access to females earlier in the year. Dramatic increases in population can be observed after large rainfall events, which are thought to come from this species' competition with small rodent population explosions following such events. Young female mothers have been observed to remain near the location of their birth, while young males often spread out, reducing competition for food, increasing opportunities to breed, and avoiding potential inbreeding. Once males find a home range, they become sedentary, remaining in a familiar area rather than moving to a new territory.

Demographic inference from genomic data on the brush-tailed mulgara suggests highly stable population sizes for all populations over much of the past 1,000 years. While some populations have declined in the last 50 to 100 years, notably the Central East population, the overall trajectory of the species for the last 350 years appears to be stable.

== Reproduction ==
Dasycercus blythi breeds seasonally, producing only one litter a year with litters reproducing the year following their birth. This reproductive strategy is different from that of other dasyurids, which often birth multiple litters a year to balance unpredictable reproductive conditions. Their monoestry is thought to arise from increased access to larger and more reliably available prey, such as small mammals and reptiles, which are inaccessible by smaller dasyurids. Unlike other dasyurids, males do not die after breeding. Studies suggest that the onset of breeding occurs by the timing of the female oestrus, as males were observed to be in proper conditions to reproduce for about a month prior to the occurrence of breeding. Gestation ranges from 30 to 48 days, being extended by factors such as scarce food resources, low temperatures, and frequency of torpor. Like all species in the infraclass marsupalia, brush-tailed mulgara undergo embryonic diapause, where the young are born prematurely. Once born, brush-tailed mulgara will climb into a lateral flap-shaped pouch (known as a marsupium) on their mother, and then attach to a teat located inside the pouch for approximately 12 to 15 weeks. A maximum of six young have been found in the pouches of collected specimens. The sex ratio in litters is 1:1, and while offspring may survive more than one mating season, only a small proportion of the population survives into a third year. In captivity, up to a five-year lifespan has been observed.

== Behavior ==
Dasycercus blythi digs deep burrows, providing protection from the extremes of climate and predation by introduced European predator species. Burrows as deep as half of a meter have been observed to be occupied by a single individual outside the breeding season. Certain populations have about half of the burrows used by an individual only once, while others were used over long periods of time, repeatedly.

Torpor is often employed by D. blythi, entering torpor at night until midday. This practice persists during reproduction even with the increased energy costs of gestation. Given the seasonal nature of D. blythi's habitat, torpor advantages include the reduction of endogenous heat production in hot temperatures and lowering of basal metabolic rate, which conserves energy of an individual.

== Conservation status ==
Numbers within the Dasycercus blythi population fluctuate greatly in accordance with climate conditions, which make population estimates difficult to establish, thus creating difficulty in tracking population trends. The cause of decline in the D. blythi population is unknown, and threatening processes have not been able to be confirmed; potential threats include changes in fire regimens, grazing by introduced herbivores such as cattle and rabbits, and predation by introduced species from European settlement. Another hypothesis is that environmental damage has had a negative impact on the mulgara population. To provide further protection and future proliferation, animal surveys using targeted trapping and patch burning programs are used to create an ideal habitat. Fire does not have a negative impact on the population as long as 15% cover is maintained.

Care for the mulgara habitat, especially with controlled burns, should employ a fire regime that burns a mosaic of land with no particular piece of land being burnt more often than once per three to five years. This will provide a fire regime that leaves the necessary 15% cover intact for successful species proliferation.

The species was reintroduced to Dirk Hartog Island, following the complete removal of livestock and feral cats, in June 2023.
