= Brian Bell (ornithologist) =

New Zealand conservationist (1930–2016

Brian Bell QSM
- Born: Brian Douglas Bell; 5 March 1930
- Died: 1 October 2016 (aged 86); Marlborough, New Zealand
- Employer: New Zealand Wildlife Service

Brian Douglas Bell QSM (5 March 1930 – 1 October 2016) was a New Zealand environmental consultant and ornithologist.

Born in 1930, Bell grew up in Marlborough and Canterbury. Surrounded by hills, braided riverbeds, islands and rocky coasts, he soon became deeply interested in natural history.

He worked for the New Zealand Wildlife Service between 1957 and 1987 on the management and conservation of threatened species. Bell, along with Don Merton, was part of the ultimately unsuccessful attempt in 1964 to save the South Island snipe, the greater short-tailed bat, and the New Zealand bush wren from extinction after the invasion of Big South Cape Island by rats.

In the 1984 Queen's Birthday Honours, Bell was awarded the Queens Service Medal for public services. He was a member of the Royal Australasian Ornithologists Union (RAOU), and was elected a Fellow of the RAOU in 1990. He was president of the Ornithological Society of New Zealand (OSNZ) from 1972 to 1979, and again from 1989 to 1995. He was awarded the OSNZ Robert Falla Memorial Award in 1987, and elected a Fellow of the Ornithological Society of New Zealand in 1998.

Bell died in Marlborough on 1 October 2016.

== See also ==
- List of ornithologists
