= Thomas Buddle =

English missionary (1812–1883)

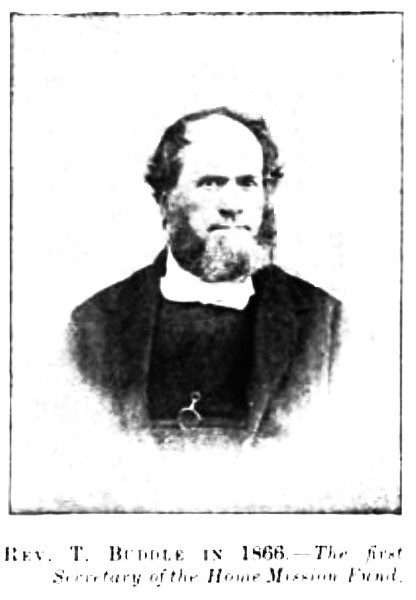
- Born: 24 December 1812; Durham, England
- Died: 27 June 1883 (aged 70); Auckland, New Zealand
- Known for: Wesleyan missionary leadership in New Zealand
- Spouse: Sarah Dixon Buddle (1813–1884)

Thomas Buddle (24 December 1812 – 27 June 1883) was an English Wesleyan Methodist missionary and leader in New Zealand.

== Early life ==
Thomas Buddle was born in Durham, County Durham, England on 24 December 1812, the son of Mary Anderson and Mathew Buddle. Buddle was ordained by the Wesleyan Methodist Conference in 1839.

On 16 August 1839 he married Sarah Dixon (1813–1884) also of Durham; Sarah was the aunt of missionary George Brown.

The couple immigrated to New Zealand the next month together with several other missionaries on the Wesleyan-Methodist Missionary Society's schooner Triton. They arrived in Hokianga in May 1840. They had ten children in the next twenty years.

== Life as a missionary in New Zealand ==
Thomas and Sarah Buddle served as missionaries among the Māori people at Whāingaroa, Porirua, Waipā, and Te Kōpua. They opened several mission schools and baptised many Māori leaders.

In 1844, he was appointed as head of the Wesleyan Native Institution, Three Kings near Auckland, a college devoted to training Māori teachers. For the next twenty-one years he ministered to Māori and Pākehā congregations in Auckland while also serving in leadership positions in Wesleyan missionary conferences. He was appointed Chairman of the Wesleyan district of Auckland in 1855. In 1860 he published a pamphlet, "The Maori King Movement in New Zealand," in which he described the dangers of the growing political power of the Kīngitanga and cautioned against the use of military force.

In 1861 he was elected secretary to the Australasian Wesleyan Conference held in Sydney, and as president of the ninth conference, held at Hobart in 1863. In 1866 he was sent to serve as chairman of the district at Christchurch then Wellington in 1870. He was sent to lead the Nelson district, and in 1874 he was elected as president of the first New Zealand Wesleyan Conference.

He edited the te reo Māori newspaper Te Haeata, which was published from 1859 to 1862. He also served as one of the Wesleyan representatives on the Māori Bible Revision Committee. In 1875 he was appointed to the newly created Three Kings Theological and Training Institution (later Wesley College).

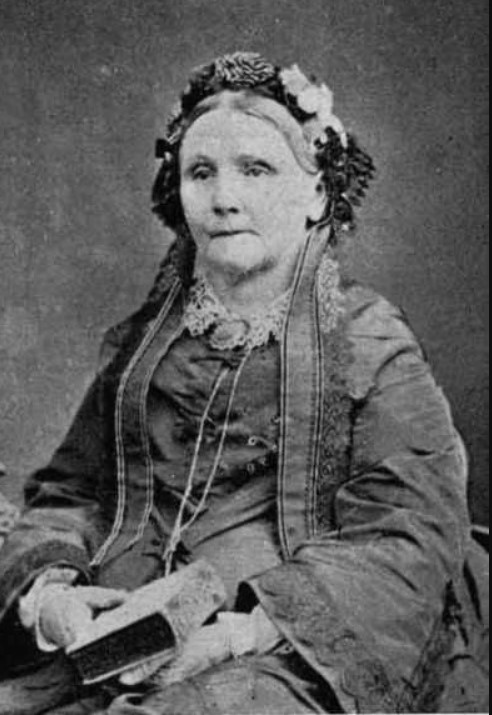
Sarah Buddle née Dixon (1813–1884)

== Retirement and death ==
Rev. Buddle retired from his role as principal and theological tutor of the Wesleyan College, Three Kings, in 1881, but continued in his role as general secretary to the Wesleyan Home Mission. He gave his last sermon on 17 June 1883 in Onehunga and grew increasingly ill complaining of pains in his chest. He died in his home at 1 a.m. on the morning of 27 June 1883. He was buried in the Symonds Street Cemetery.
