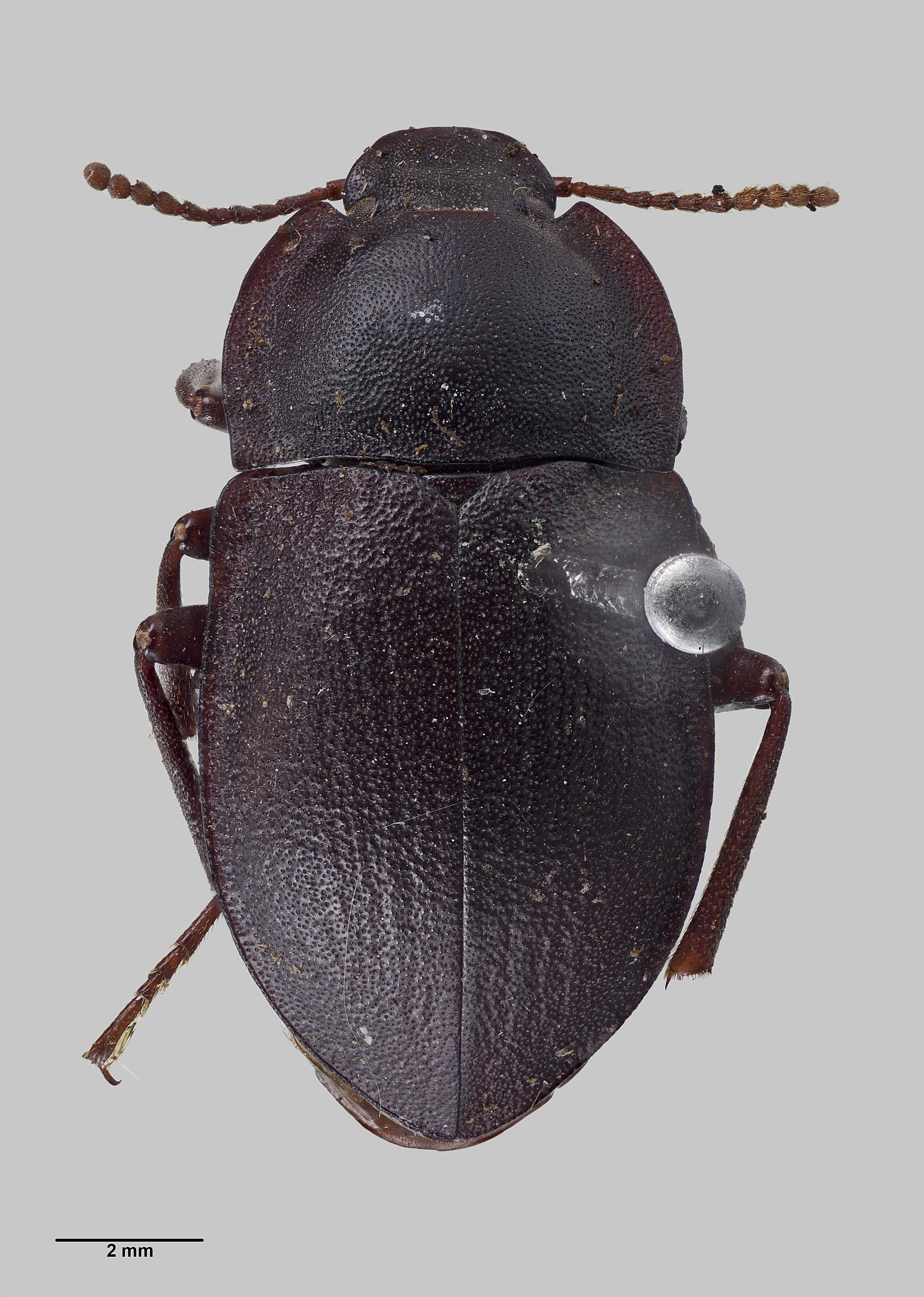
- Male holotype specimen from the Auckland War Memorial Museum collections

Conservation status
- Naturally Uncommon (NZ TCS)

Scientific classification
- Domain: Eukaryota
- Kingdom: Animalia
- Phylum: Arthropoda
- Class: Insecta
- Order: Coleoptera
- Suborder: Polyphaga
- Infraorder: Cucujiformia
- Family: Tenebrionidae
- Genus: Mimopeus
- Species: M. turbotti

Binomial name
- Mimopeus turbotti Watt, 1988

= Mimopeus turbotti =

Species of beetle

Mimopeus turbotti is a species of darkling beetle belonging to the family Tenebrionidae. The species was first described by John Charles Watt in 1988, and is endemic to Manawatāwhi / Three Kings Islands in New Zealand.

== Taxonomy ==
The species was identified by John Charles Watt in 1988, based on a specimen collected from Manawatāwhi / Great Island by Evan Graham Turbott in 1946. Watt named the species after Turbott.

== Description ==
Watt's original text (the type description) reads as follows:

MALE: Broader and less convex than M. elongatus. Upper surface dull black, legs and antennae reddish black, undersurface shining black.

Dorsal surface. Labrum slightly emarginate anteriorly, punctures larger and deeper than in M. elongatus, yellow setae stout. Dorsal surface of head as in M. elongatus but punctures deeper and microsculpture of interstices very strong, clearly visible at 25x magnification. Pronotum (Fig.19) more transverse than in M. elongatus almost as broad as elytra, anterior and posterior angles blunter, apex more deeply emarginate, submarginal channels distinct, expansions outside them very broad and more strongly reflexed than in M. elongatus West Coast populations. Pronotal punctures larger, deeper, and more steep-sided than in M. elongatus, those of disc sparse, separated by more than twice their own diameter. Very few small punctures visible on interstices, most being replaced by granules, visible at 25x magnification. Scutellum triangular, transverse, finely and deeply punctate. Elytra broader and less convex than in M. elongatus, submarginal channels broader, particularly at shoulder, which is broadly rounded as in M. elongatus. Punctures deep, rather steep-sided, separated by at least their own diameter, often by twice their own diameter, interstices bear distinct shining granules, larger than those of pronotum, elsewhere microsculpture strong, clearly visible at 25x magnification. Costae are lacking, but there are irregular linear depressions visible with side-lighting. Ventral surface. Mentum as in M. elongatus, Pregular region of postgenae more deeply and closely punctured, gular region finely punctate, interstices with a few small granules, setae of punctures stouter than in M. elongatus. Gula with very fine transverse striae just visible at 25x magnification, and with a few broad, indistinct, transverse depressions. Prosternal intercoxal process broader posteriorly than in M. elongatus, prosternum bearing a few small granules. Proepisternum with strong microsculpture, finely punctate, outer margins distinctly reflexed so that prothoracic margin is more distinctly foliate than in any other species of the genus. Mesosternal intercoxal process narrower than in M. elongatus submarginal grooves very indistinct. Metasternum finely punctate, interstices without granules, metepisternum more deeply punctured than metasternum. Abdominal sternites shining, slightly rugose longitudinally, finely punctured. Distinct submarginal grooves present on all except first visible sternite. Epipleura of elytra with strong microsculpture, bearing scattered granules visible at 25x magnification. Legs. As in M. elongatus. Aedeagus (Fig.29). Slender, smaller than in most populations of M. elongatus. In dorsal view basale parallel-sided, apicale slender and relatively elongate. Slender in lateral view, not strongly curved, apicale arched.

FEMALE: Like male, often slightly broader, averaging larger, but very difficult to distinguish without dissection.

Watt measured the average length of M. turbotti as between 12.2–15.8 mm (0.48–0.62 in), with a width of between 5.8–8.2 mm (0.23–0.32 in). Watt noted that the species was closest morphologically to M. elongatus, and could be distinguished by differing aedeagus structures and M. turbotti being larger and broader in size.

== Distribution and habitat ==
The species is endemic to New Zealand, found on the Manawatāwhi / Three Kings Islands, northwest of the North Island of New Zealand.
