= Elachista watti =

Scientific classification
- Kingdom: Animalia
- Phylum: Arthropoda
- Clade: Pancrustacea
- Class: Insecta
- Order: Lepidoptera
- Family: Elachistidae
- Genus: Elachista
- Species: E. watti

Binomial name
- Elachista watti Philpott, 1924

Synonyms
- Cosmiotes watti (Philpott, 1924)

Species of moth endemic to New Zealand

Elachista watti is a moth in the family Elachistidae. It was first described by Alfred Philpott in 1924. It is endemic to New Zealand and has been observed in the North Island. This species likely inhabits grassland and its larvae likely mine the leaves or stems of grass, rush or sedge species. Adults have been recorded on the wing in January.

== Taxonomy ==
This species was first described by Alfred Philpott in 1924 and originally named Elachista watti. Philpott used specimens collected by Charles Cuthbert Fenwick and John Charles Watt at Waimarino in January. George Hudson discussed this species as a synonym of Elachista exaula in his 1928 book The butterflies and moths of New Zealand. In 1971 John S. Dugdale placed this species in the genus Cosmiotes. In 1988 Dugdale confirmed that placement. In 1999 LaurI. Kaila placed this species back in the genus Elachista. This placement was followed in 2010 in the New Zealand Inventory of Biodiversity. The male holotype is held at Te Papa.

== Description ==
Philpott described the adult male of this species as follows:

♂ 7–8½ mm. Head white, slightly mixed with pale fuscous. Palpi white. Antennae fuscous - grey. Thorax white mixed with fuscous. Abdomen greyish-fuscous, anal tuft ochreous-white. Legs ochreous-white, anterior pair infuscated. Forewings lanceolate; metallic white, more or less infuscated, particularly on basal ¼ of costa; a linear spot of fuscous below fold at ⅗; a median fuscous streak from ¾ to near apex; both these markings usually obscure or absent: cilia pale fuscous, round apex clear white. Hindwings and cilia greyish-fuscous.

This species is similar in appearance to E. exaula but lacks the conspicuous black markings of that latter species. This small moth has wings that appear feather like as a result of the length of its cilia and its hindwings are reduced in size.

== Distribution ==
This species is endemic to New Zealand and has been observed in the North Island.

== Habitat and hosts ==
The species likely inhabits grassland and the larvae likely mine the leaves or stems of grass, rush or sedge species.

== Behaviour ==
Adults have been recorded on the wing in January.
