= Pholcomma turbotti =

Conservation status
- Not Threatened (NZ TCS)

Scientific classification
- Domain: Eukaryota
- Kingdom: Animalia
- Phylum: Arthropoda
- Subphylum: Chelicerata
- Class: Arachnida
- Order: Araneae
- Infraorder: Araneomorphae
- Family: Theridiidae
- Genus: Pholcomma
- Species: P. turbotti

Binomial name
- Pholcomma turbotti Marples, 1956

Synonyms
- Armigera turbotti Marples, 1956

Species of spider

Pholcomma turbotti is a species of spider in the family Theridiidae. The species was first described by Brian John Marples in 1956. Formerly thought to be endemic to Manawatāwhi / Three Kings Islands to the northwest of New Zealand, the species has since been identified on Cuvier Island.

== Taxonomy ==
The species was identified by Marples in 1956, who named the species Armigera turbotti, placing it in a novel genus. Marples was unsure if this species should be placed within the Pholcomatinae subfamily due to recent taxonomic changes in Pholcomma, and decided to create a new genus due to this ambiguity. Marples named the species after Graham Turbott, who had collected the original specimen from under stones on Manawatāwhi / Great Island. In 1962, Herbert Walter Levi and Lorna Rose Levi synonymised the genus Armigera, moving this species to Pholcomma.

== Description ==
Marples' original text (the type description) reads as follows:

Male.—Length 1.56 mm (0.061 in). Dark chestnut brown, appendages slightly lighter.

Carapace: Length 0.87 mm (0.034 in)., breadth 0.67 mm (0.026 in). High, with vertical clypeus. Slightly concave posterior surface where overhung by the abdomen. Carapace, sternum and the hard sclerities on the abdomen with a uniform granular surface.

Eyes: 8, AME dark. From above, anterior row strongly recurved, posterior row straight. Ratio of the diameters of the eyes and their distances apart: AM, 105; AL, 94: PM, 105; PL, 103; AM-AM, 57; AM-AL, 32; AM-PM, 70; PM-PM, 108; PM-PL, 66; L-L, 0: clypeus, 225. Breadth of eyegroup 0.37 mm (0.015 in).

Chehicerae: Small and vertical.

Maxillae: Broad, truncated anteriorly, with black serrula. Outer margins parallel, inner margin converging but not meeting.

Lip: Free, more or less semicircular.

Sternum: Length 0.41 mm (0.016 in)., breadth 0.43 mm (0.017 in), Heart-shaped with a blunt posterior end widely separating coxae IV and joined to the carapace behind them.

Palp: Slender, with large palpal organ, as in figure. The embolus is long. On the prolateral side it is bent into a circle then turns back on itself, passes between the bulb and the cymbium and turns again as in the figure. Three claws with few pectinations. Few pectinated bristles, no more on IV, No spines. Trichobothria: 1 on metatarsi, 2 on tibiae. Tarsal organ present, on I 63% of the length of the tarsus from the distal end.

Abdomen: Length 1.12 mm (0.044 in)., breadth 0.90 mm (0.035 in), The whole dorsal surface covered by a single smoothly-domed sclerite. An epigastric sclerite covers the anterior two-thirds of the ventral surface, lateral to it on each side is a very small sclerite, and an annular one surrounds the spinnerets. In the cuticle covering the remainder are small thickenings forming longitudinal ridges, three of which pass dorsal to the spinnerets.

== Distribution and habitat ==
The species is endemic to New Zealand, known to occur on Manawatāwhi / Three Kings Islands. Since 1999, observations have been made on Cuvier Island.
