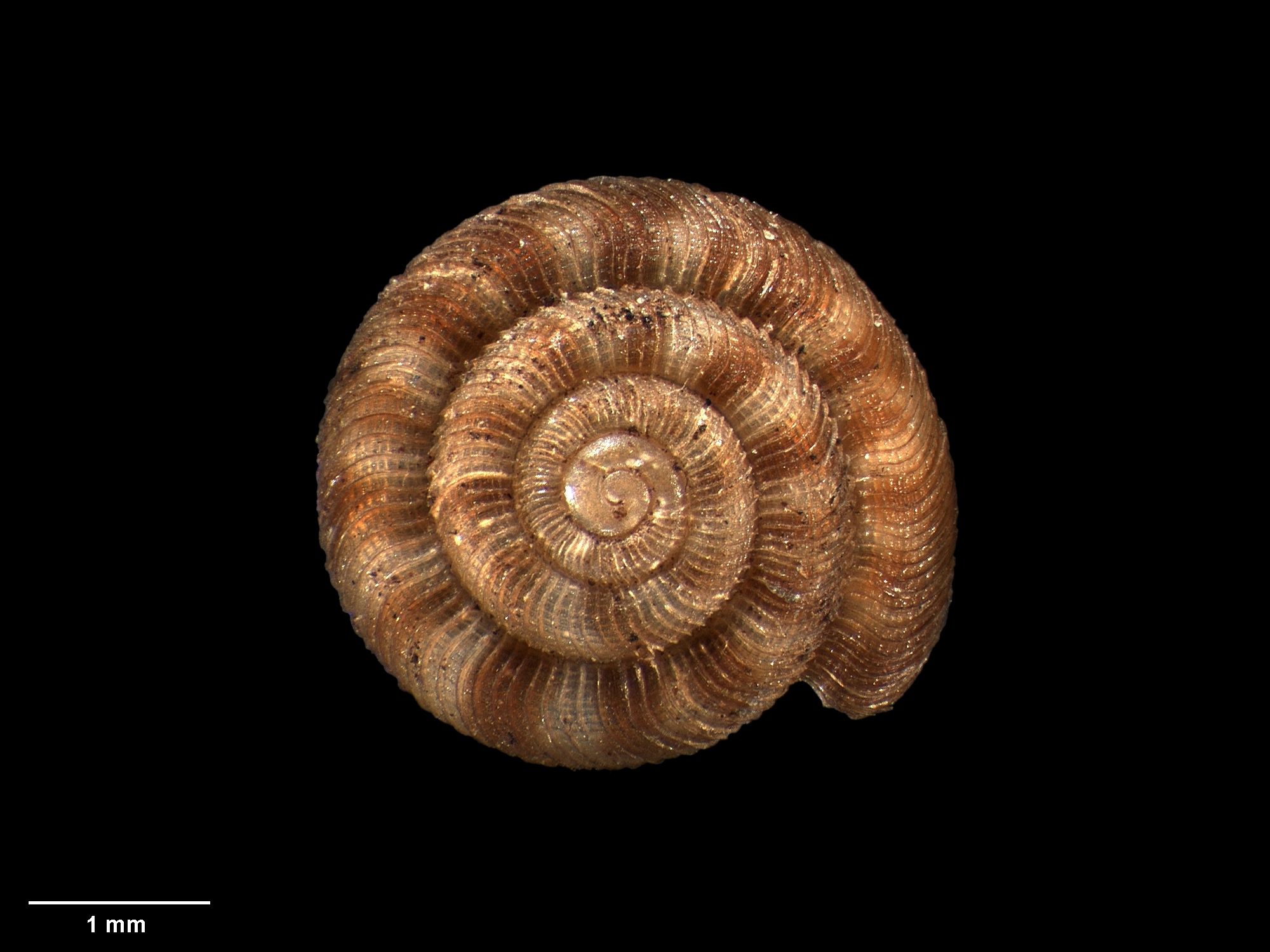

Conservation status
- Naturally Uncommon (NZ TCS)

Scientific classification
- Kingdom: Animalia
- Phylum: Mollusca
- Class: Gastropoda
- Order: Stylommatophora
- Family: Charopidae
- Genus: Egestula
- Species: E. bicolor

Binomial name
- Egestula bicolor (Climo, 1973)

Synonyms
- Charopa bicolor Climo, 1973; Charopa (Egestula) bicolor Climo, 1973

= Egestula bicolor =

Species of land snail

Egestula bicolor is a species of Gastropoda of the genus Egestula.

== Taxonomy ==
This species was originally described as Charopa bicolor by Frank Climo in 1973. The holotype specimen was collected by Frank Climo at Great Island, below Castaway Camp during the 1970 Three Kings Islands expedition.

== Description ==
The shell is 3.8mm in diameter.

== Distribution and habitat ==
This species is only known from Great Island in the Three Kings Islands group of New Zealand. In one survey, it was recorded at 91% of sites on the island and has been suggested to be the most widespread snail species on the island. It is apparently associated with Leptospermum. It has been hypothesized to be a colonizer of areas not yet inhabited by other land snails.

== Conservation status ==
Under the New Zealand Threat Classification System, this species is listed as Naturally Uncommon with the qualifiers of "Conservation Dependent", "Island Endemic", "Range Restricted" and "Biologically Sparse".
