= Aucklandobius turbotti =

Conservation status
- Naturally Uncommon (NZ TCS)

Scientific classification
- Domain: Eukaryota
- Kingdom: Animalia
- Phylum: Arthropoda
- Class: Insecta
- Order: Plecoptera
- Family: Gripopterygidae
- Genus: Aucklandobius
- Species: A. turbotti

Binomial name
- Aucklandobius turbotti Illies, 1963

Synonyms
- Apteryoperla turbotti (Illies, 1963)

Species of stonefly

Aucklandobius turbotti is a species of stonefly in the family Gripopterygidae. The species was first described by Joachim Illies in 1963, and is endemic to the Auckland Islands of New Zealand.

== Taxonomy ==
The species was identified by Illies in 1963, who named the species Apteryoperla turbotti based on larvae. Illies named the species after Evan Graham Turbott. The species can be differentiated from A. kuscheli due to the smaller size of A. turbotti. The species has since been recombined as a member of the genus Aucklandobius.

== Description ==
A. turbotti is dark-brown in colour, with yellow markings. Males of the species are 10–12 mm (0.39–0.47 in) in length, with females measuring between 10–17 mm (0.39–0.67 in).

== Distribution and habitat ==
The species is endemic to New Zealand, found in the Auckland Islands.
