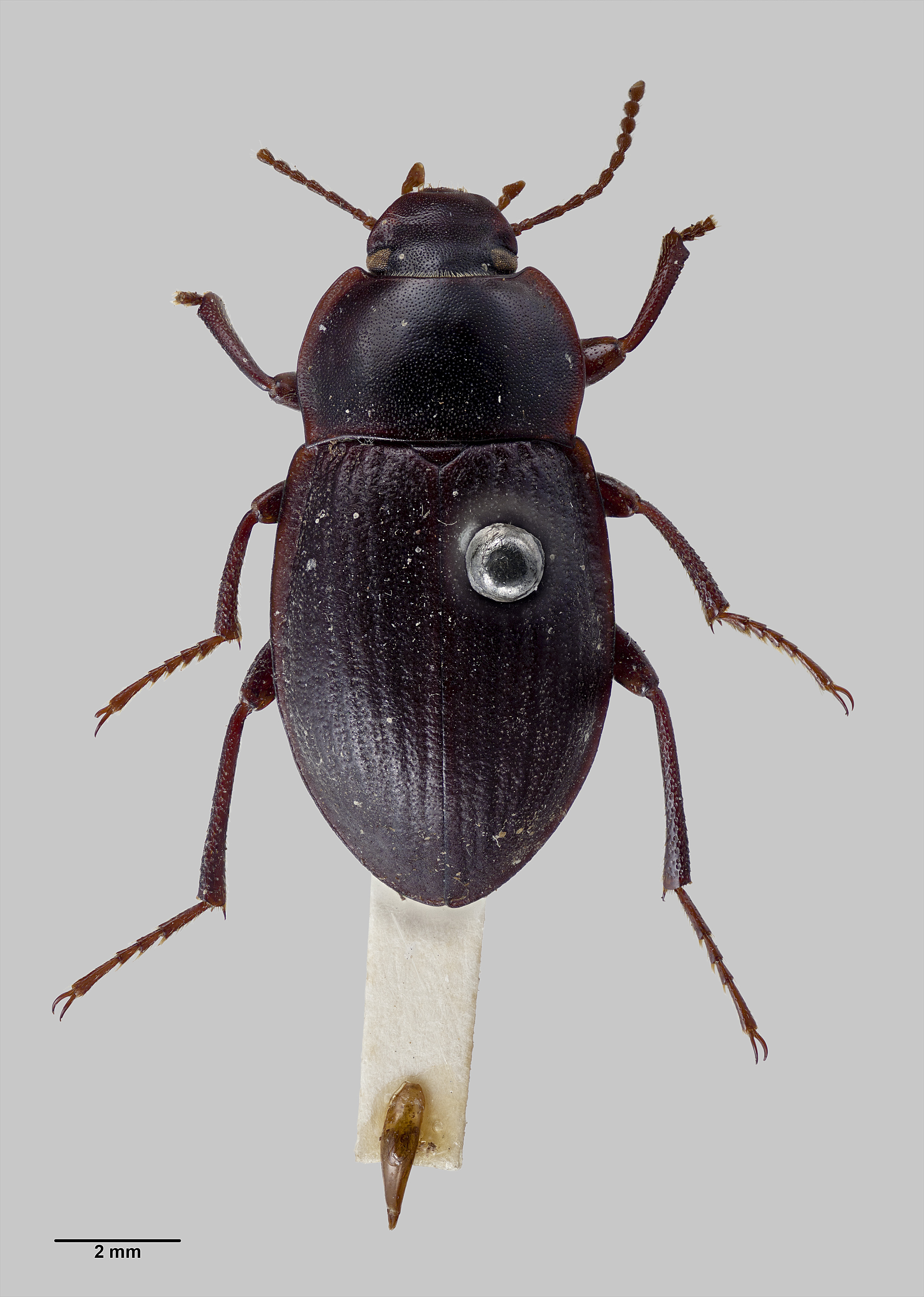
- Mimopeus neglectus collected from Wellington, New Zealand

Scientific classification
- Domain: Eukaryota
- Kingdom: Animalia
- Phylum: Arthropoda
- Class: Insecta
- Order: Coleoptera
- Suborder: Polyphaga
- Infraorder: Cucujiformia
- Family: Tenebrionidae
- Genus: Mimopeus
- Species: M. neglectus

Binomial name
- Mimopeus neglectus Watt, 1988

= Mimopeus neglectus =

Species of beetle

Mimopeus neglectus is a species of darkling beetle in the subfamily Tenebrioninae, first described by J. C. Watt in 1988. It occurs around the Cook Strait area of New Zealand, on both the North and South Islands.

The beetles are a reddish brown or black colour, with a shiny underside. The species is similar morphologically to the North Island Mimopeus elongatus, however has a consistently different tapered structure of aedeagus. Unlike Mimopeus elongatus which consistently prefers living around Muehlenbeckia complexa plants, Mimopeus neglectus does not show a preference for exclusively preferring Muehlenbeckia complexa, and can be found around a variety of coastal grasses.
