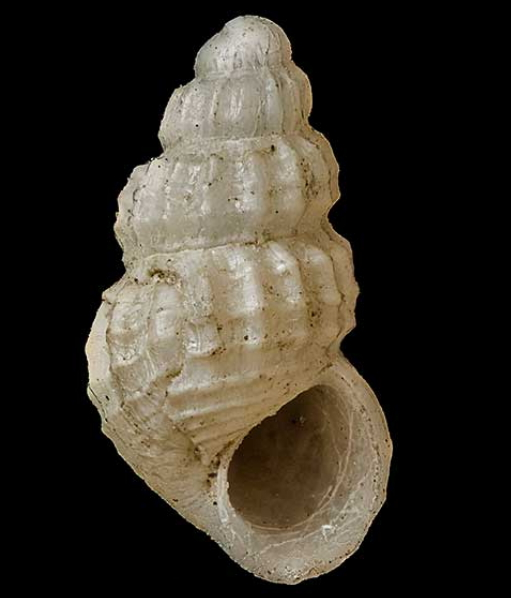
- Shell of Alvania pinguoides (specimen at the Museum of New Zealand)

Scientific classification
- Kingdom: Animalia
- Phylum: Mollusca
- Class: Gastropoda
- Subclass: Caenogastropoda
- Order: Littorinimorpha
- Superfamily: Rissooidea
- Family: Rissoidae
- Genus: Alvania
- Species: A. pinguoides

Binomial name
- Alvania pinguoides (A. W. B. Powell, 1940)

Synonyms
- Alvania (Linemera) pinguoides (A. W. B. Powell, 1940) · alternate representation; Alvinia (Linemera) pinguoides (A. W. B. Powell, 1940) (superseded combination); Linemera pinguoides A. W. B. Powell, 1940 (superseded combination)

= Alvania pinguoides =

Species of gastropod

Alvania pinguoides is a species of small sea snail, a marine gastropod mollusk or micromollusk in the family Rissoidae.

== Description ==
The length of the shell attains 2.3 mm, its diameter 1.3 mm.

== Distribution ==
This species occurs is endemic to New Zealand and occurs off Three Kings Islands to Northland.
