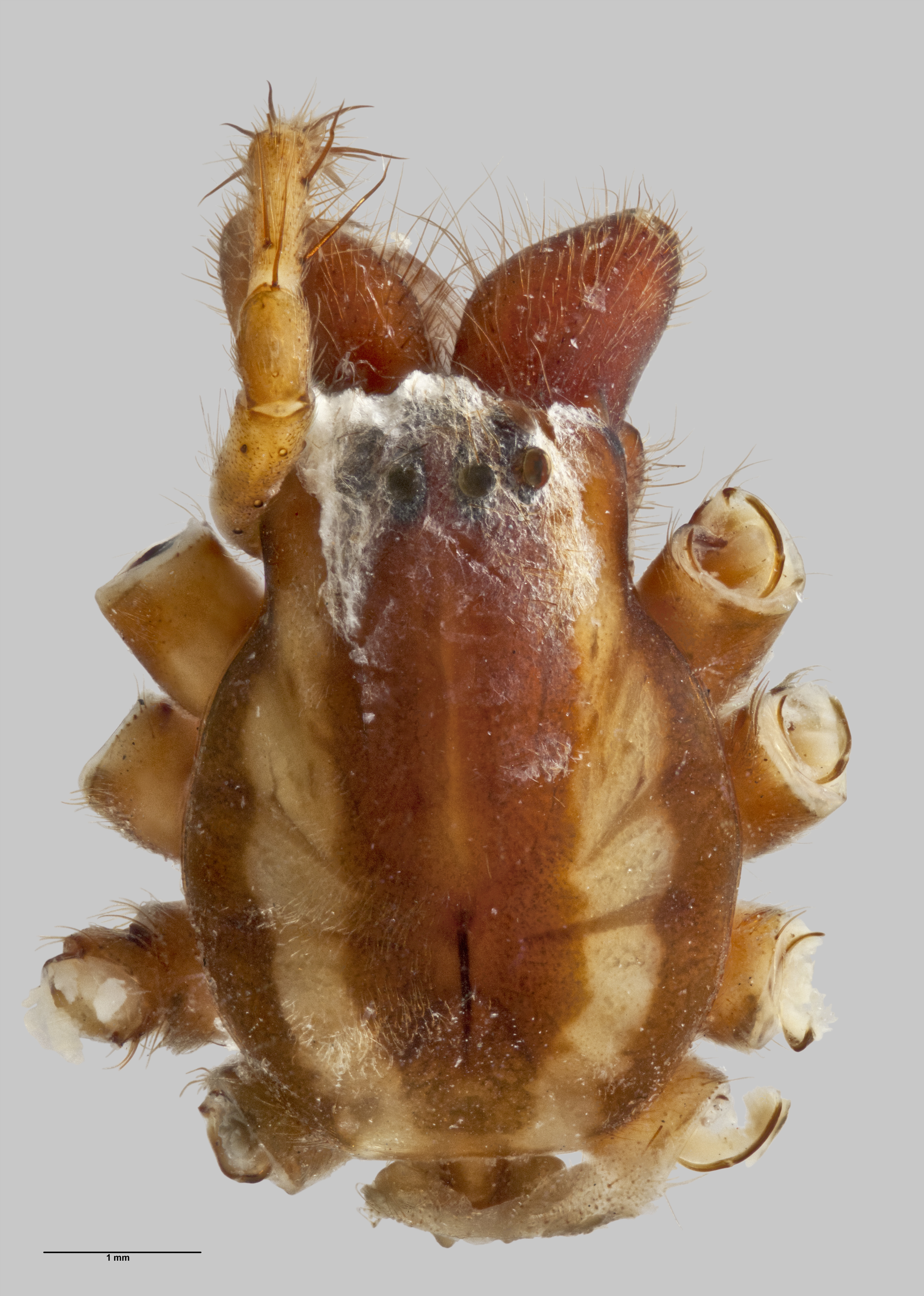
- Holotype of Cambridgea turbotti from the collections of Auckland War Memorial Museum

Conservation status
- Data Deficit (NZ TCS)

Scientific classification
- Kingdom: Animalia
- Phylum: Arthropoda
- Subphylum: Chelicerata
- Class: Arachnida
- Order: Araneae
- Infraorder: Araneomorphae
- Family: Desidae
- Genus: Cambridgea
- Species: C. turbotti

Binomial name
- Cambridgea turbotti Forster & Wilton, 1973

Synonyms
- Cambridgea grandis (Blest & Vink, 2000); Nanocambridgea grandis (Blest & Vink, 2000)

= Cambridgea turbotti =

Species of spider

Cambridgea turbotti is a species of spider in the family Desidae. The species was first described by Ray Forster and Cecil Louis Wilton in 1973, and is endemic to New Zealand.

== Taxonomy ==
The species was identified by Ray Forster and Cecil Louis Wilton in 1973, based on a specimen collected Evan Graham Turbott in 1946 from Manawatāwhi / Great Island. Forster and Wilton named the species after Evan Graham Turbott.

== Description ==
C. turbotti has a reddish brown chelicerae, with a greyish brown abdomen, with an abdomen length of 5.0 mm (0.20 in).

== Distribution and habitat ==
The species is endemic to New Zealand, found in the Manawatāwhi / Three Kings Islands.
