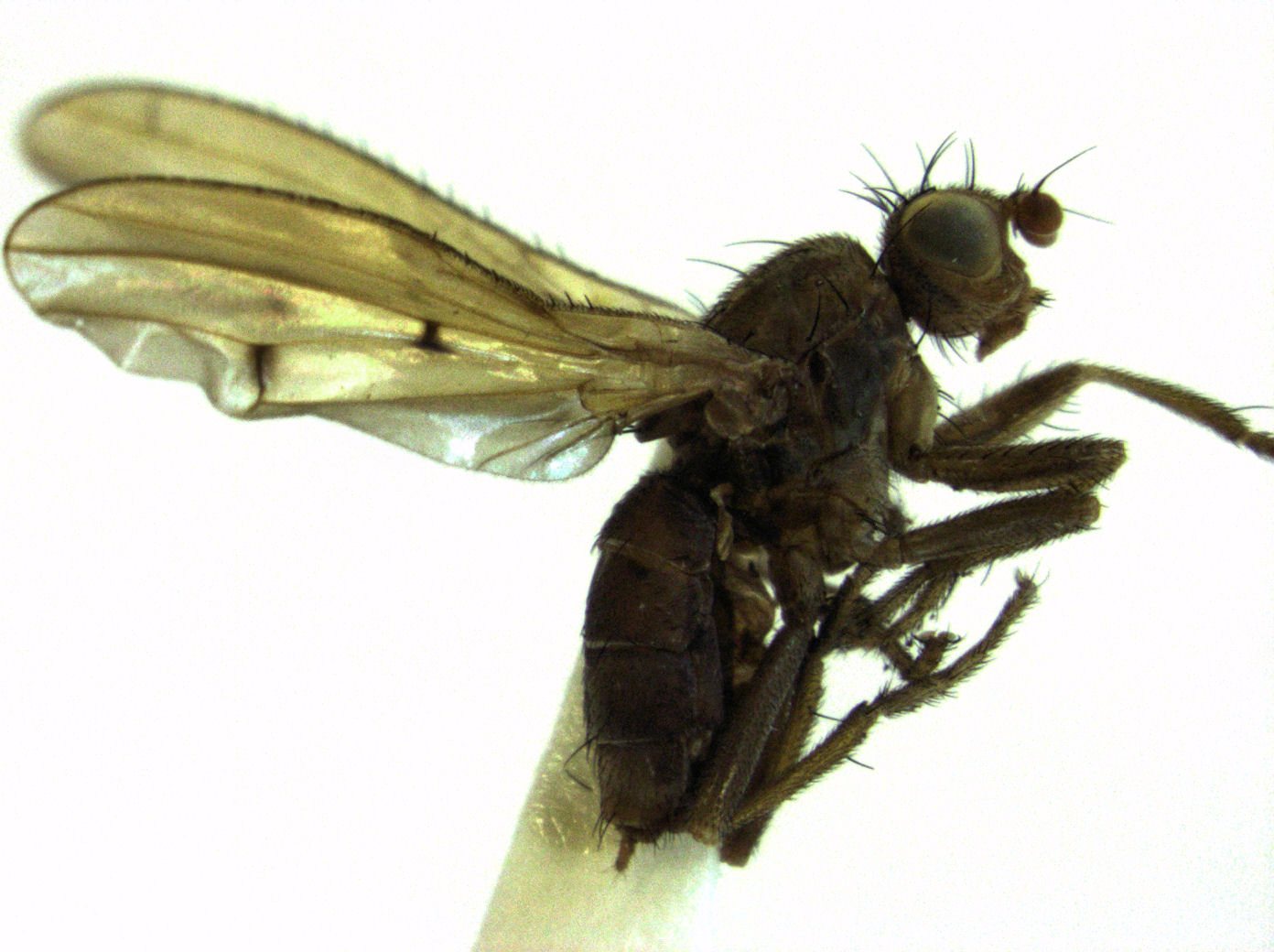

Conservation status
- Naturally Uncommon (NZ TCS)

Scientific classification
- Kingdom: Animalia
- Phylum: Arthropoda
- Class: Insecta
- Order: Diptera
- Family: Helosciomyzidae
- Genus: Xenosciomyza
- Species: X. turbotti

Binomial name
- Xenosciomyza turbotti Harrison, 1955

= Xenosciomyza turbotti =

Species of fly

Xenosciomyza turbotti is a species of fly in the family Helosciomyzidae. The species was first described by Roy A. Harrison in 1955, and is endemic to the Auckland Islands south of New Zealand.

== Taxonomy ==
The species was identified by Roy A. Harrison in 1955, based on a specimen collected from Carnley Harbour on Auckland Island by Evan Graham Turbott in October 1944. Harrison named the species after Turbott. This was the second species identified for the genus, following X. prima in 1928.

== Description ==
X. turbotti is light brown in colour, with an approximate body length of 8 mm (0.31 in), with a wing length of 8 mm (0.31 in). Males have finer and longer body hairs relative to females of the same species. X. turbotti has a brown arista with pubescent rays short than the diameter of the basal segment. The species can be differentiated from X. prima due to the presence of only a single sternopleural.

== Distribution and habitat ==
The species is endemic to New Zealand, found in the Auckland Islands.
