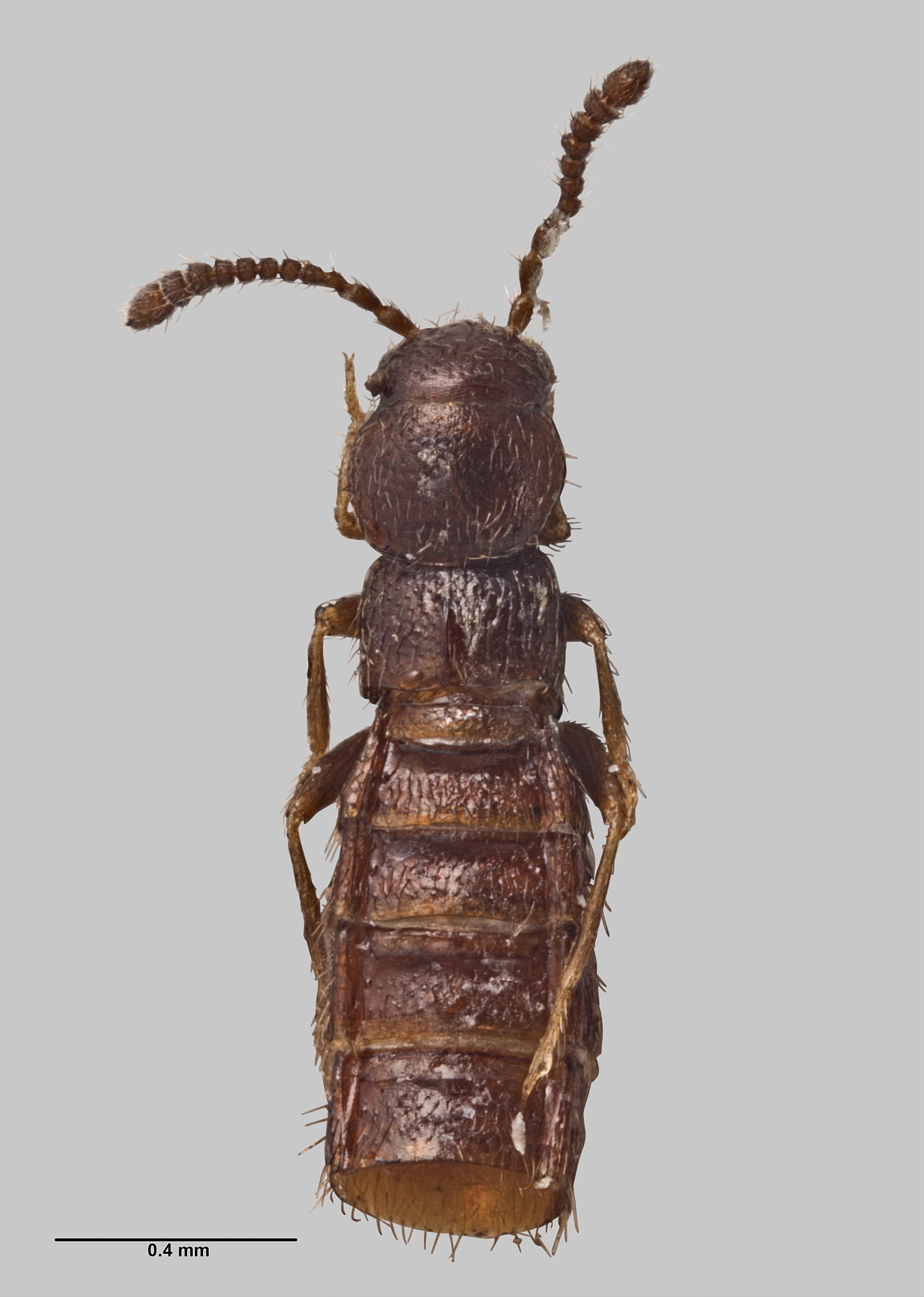
- Lectotype from the Auckland War Memorial Museum collections

Scientific classification
- Kingdom: Animalia
- Phylum: Arthropoda
- Class: Insecta
- Order: Coleoptera
- Suborder: Polyphaga
- Infraorder: Staphyliniformia
- Family: Staphylinidae
- Genus: Pseudopisalia; Cameron, 1950
- Species: P. turbotti

Binomial name
- Pseudopisalia turbotti Cameron, 1950

= Pseudopisalia =

Species of beetle

Pseudopisalia is a monotypic genus of rove beetle belonging to the family Staphylinidae. The sole species found in this genus is Pseudopisalia turbotti. Both the genus and species were first described by Malcolm Cameron in 1950. Pseudopisalia turbotti is endemic to Manawatāwhi / Three Kings Islands in New Zealand.

== Taxonomy ==
The genus and species was identified by English entomologist Malcolm Cameron in 1950, based on specimens collected by Evan Graham Turbott from Manawatāwhi / Great Island in October 1948. Cameron named the species after Turbott.

== Description ==
The species has a dark reddish brown colour, and a length of between 1.5–1.75 mm (0.059–0.069 in).

== Distribution and habitat ==
The species is endemic to New Zealand, found on the Manawatāwhi / Three Kings Islands, northwest of the North Island of New Zealand.
