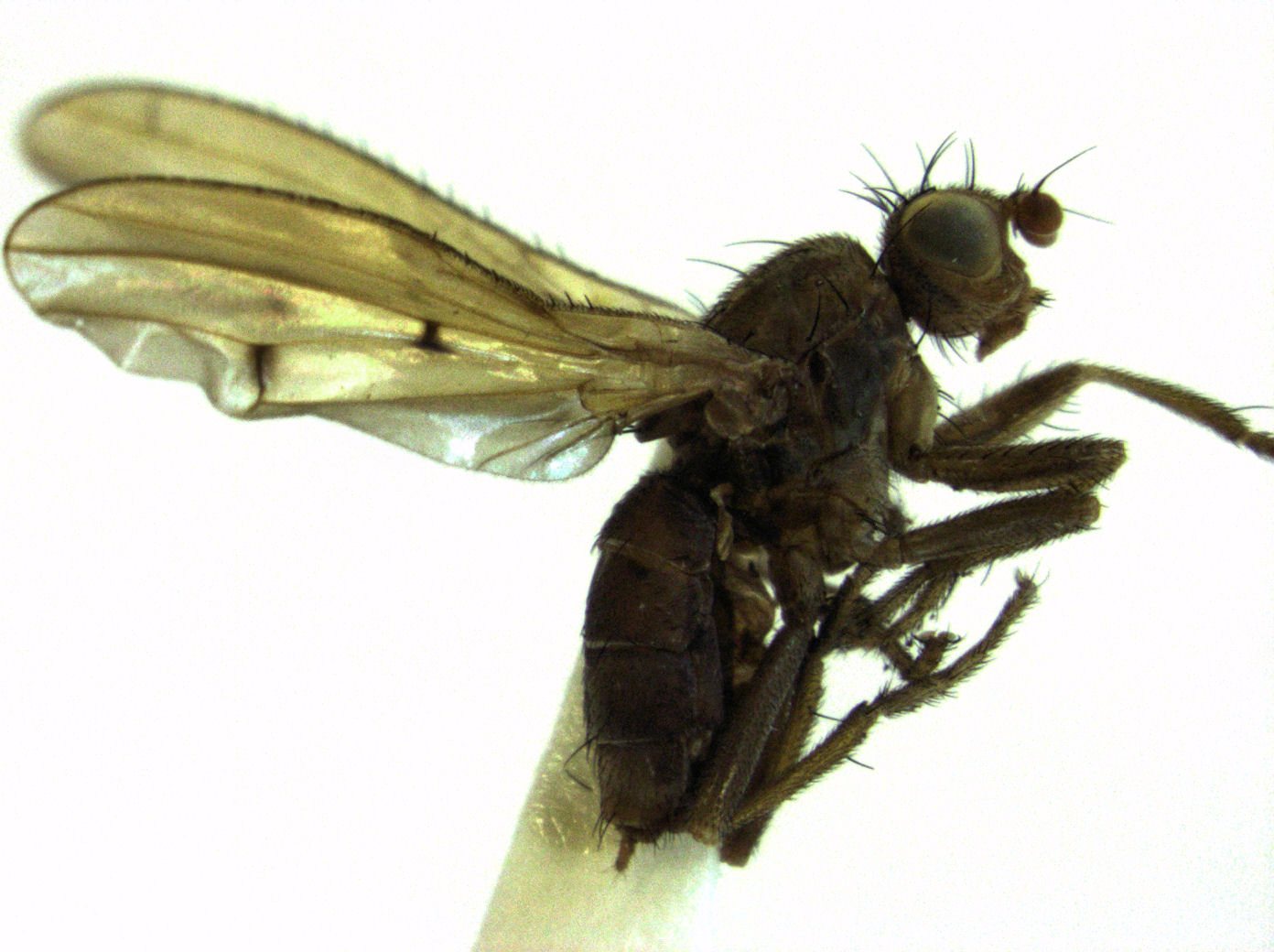
- Xenosciomyza turbotti

Scientific classification
- Kingdom: Animalia
- Phylum: Arthropoda
- Class: Insecta
- Order: Diptera
- Family: Helosciomyzidae
- Genus: Xenosciomyza; Tonnoir & Malloch, 1928

Species
- See text

= Xenosciomyza =

Genus of insects

Xenosciomyza is a genus of flies belonging to the family Helosciomyzidae. The genus was first described by André Léon Tonnoir and John Russell Malloch in 1928.

== Distribution ==
The genus is native to New Zealand.

== Species ==
These two species are recognized in the genus:

- Xenosciomyza prima Tonnoir & Malloch, 1928
- Xenosciomyza turbotti Harrison, 1955
