= 1970 Three Kings Islands expedition =

DSIR entomology division 1970 expedition to the Three Kings Islands

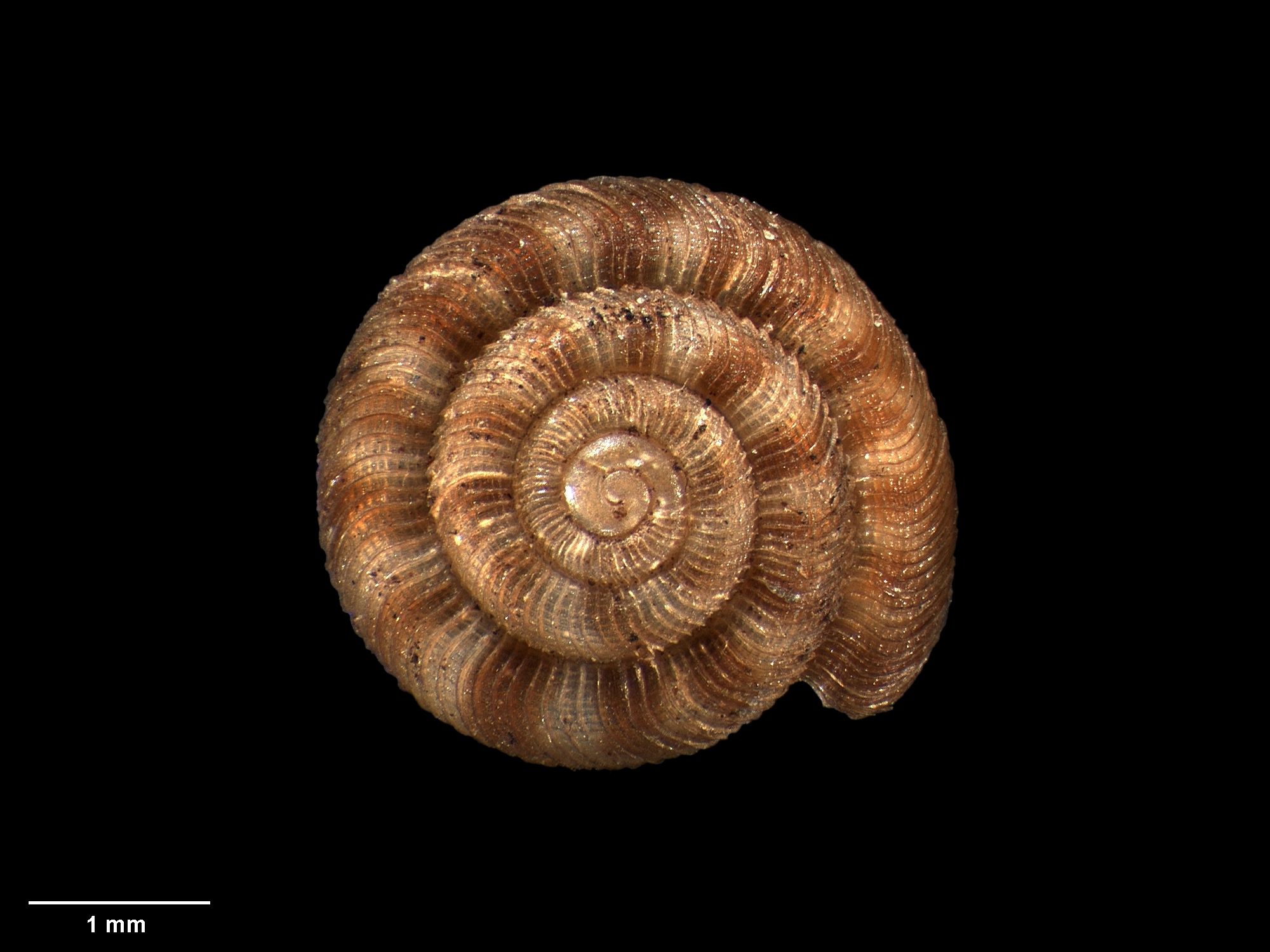
- Country: New Zealand
- Location: Manawatāwhi / Three Kings Islands
- Country of origin: New Zealand
- Start: Devonport Naval Base; 4 November 1970
- End: Auckland c. 26 November 1970
- Leader: Guillermo Kuschel
- Organiser: Department of Scientific and Industrial Research
- Vessels: HMAS Kiama
- Participants: Guillermo Kuschel; John Gordon Rees McBurney; Graeme William Ramsay; John Charles Watt; David Galloway; Dennis Huckvale Leigh; Frank Climo

The Three Kings Islands expedition was a research expedition organised by the entomological section of the New Zealand Department of Scientific and Industrial Research (DSIR) to research into the fauna and flora of the Manawatāwhi / Three Kings Islands. The expedition took place in November 1970.

== Voyage ==
The expedition party left Devonport Naval Base on 4 November 1970 in HMNZS Kiama and landed the following morning at Great Island. With support from the crew, they established a camp in Castaway Valley and established radio contact.

The camp was made up of two dormitory tents, a laboratory tent, and another for their stores and mess. One of the sleeping tents got the name 'Centipede Lodge' for the number of the insects coming inside at night.

Water was in short supply, with the main freshwater source substantially drying up over the month.

They stayed for most of the month, returning to Auckland on 26 November on the same vessel.

== Participants ==
- Guillermo Kuschel, leader, entomology
- John Gordon Reeves McBurney, entomology
- Graeme William Ramsay, entomology
- John Charles Watt, DSIR, entomology
- David Galloway, DSIR, botany
- Dennis Huckvale Leigh, Parks and Reserves, Nelson, botany
- Frank Climo, Dominion Museum, malacology

== Noteworthy events ==
The holotype specimen of Egestula bicolor (Climo, 1973) was collected during this expedition.
