= Pholcomma antipodianum =

Conservation status
- Naturally Uncommon (NZ TCS)

Scientific classification
- Kingdom: Animalia
- Phylum: Arthropoda
- Subphylum: Chelicerata
- Class: Arachnida
- Order: Araneae
- Infraorder: Araneomorphae
- Family: Theridiidae
- Genus: Pholcomma
- Species: P. antipodianum

Binomial name
- Pholcomma antipodianum (Forster, 1955)

Synonyms
- Erigone antipodiana Forster, 1955; Pholcomma hickmani Forster, 1964

Species of spider

Pholcomma antipodianum is a species of cobweb spider that is endemic to New Zealand.

== Taxonomy ==
This species was described as Erigone antipodiana in 1955 by Ray Forster from male specimens. In 1957, it was moved to the Phocomma genus. The holotype is stored in Te Papa Museum under registration number AS.000004.

== Description ==
The female is recorded at 2.61mm in length. The carapace is dark blackish brown. The abdomen is greyish black.

== Distribution ==
This species is only known from Antipodes Island in New Zealand.

== Conservation status ==
Under the New Zealand Threat Classification System, this species is listed as "Naturally Uncommon" with the qualifiers of "Island Endemic" and "One Location".
