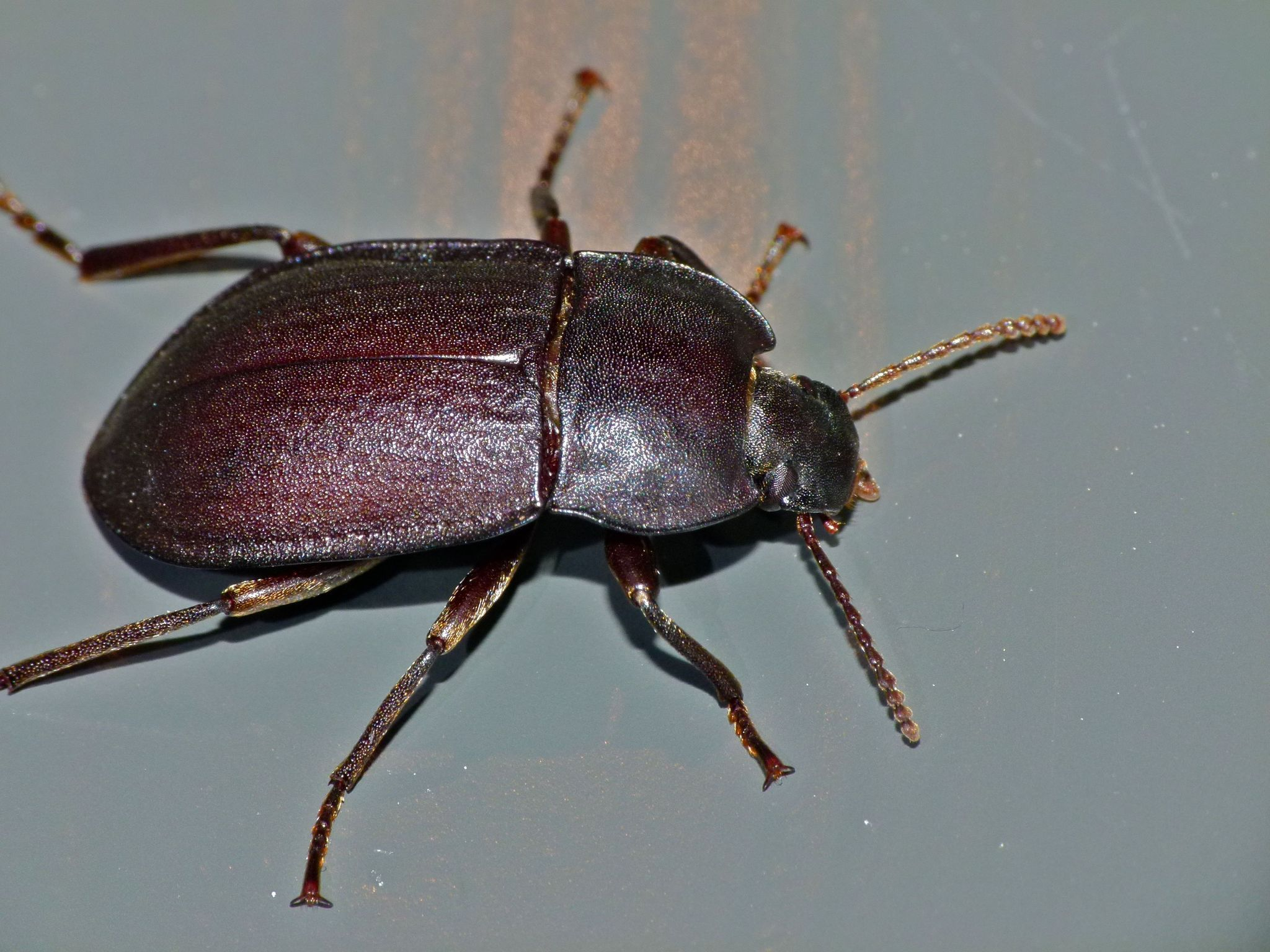

Scientific classification
- Domain: Eukaryota
- Kingdom: Animalia
- Phylum: Arthropoda
- Class: Insecta
- Order: Coleoptera
- Suborder: Polyphaga
- Infraorder: Cucujiformia
- Family: Tenebrionidae
- Genus: Mimopeus
- Species: M. opaculus

Binomial name
- Mimopeus opaculus (Bates, 1873)

= Mimopeus opaculus =

Species of beetle

Mimopeus opaculus is a species of darkling beetle.

== Description ==
A medium-sized scarabinoid beetle that is a dull grey throughout.

== Range ==
New Zealand. It is common on mammal-free islets, and in refuges.
