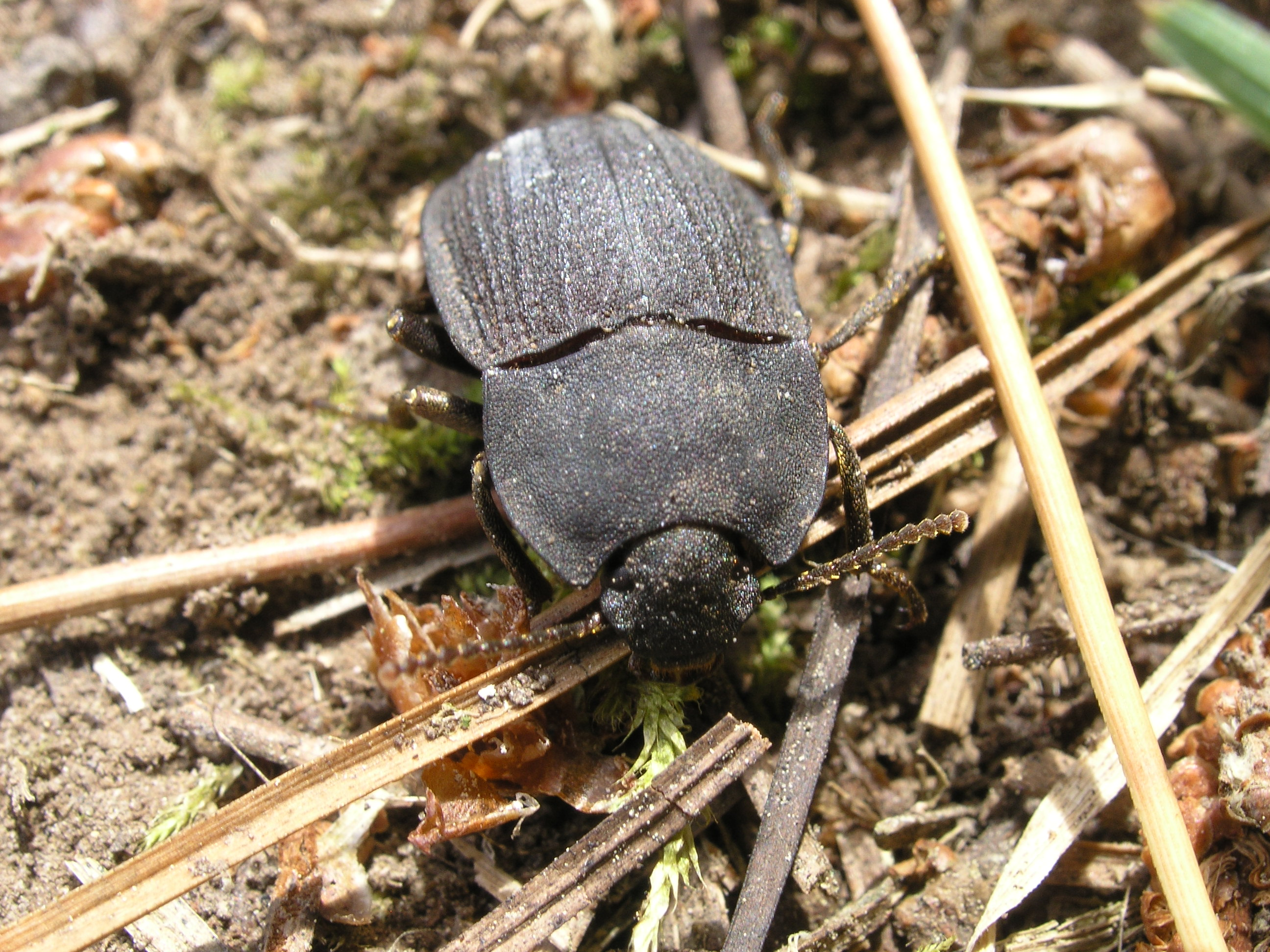
- An unidentified Mimopeus beetle in New Zealand.

Scientific classification
- Domain: Eukaryota
- Kingdom: Animalia
- Phylum: Arthropoda
- Class: Insecta
- Order: Coleoptera
- Suborder: Polyphaga
- Infraorder: Cucujiformia
- Family: Tenebrionidae
- Subfamily: Tenebrioninae
- Genus: Mimopeus; Pascoe, 1866

= Mimopeus =

Genus of insects

Mimopeus is a genus of darkling beetles in the family Tenebrionidae, first described by Francis Polkinghorne Pascoe in 1866. It is endemic to New Zealand.

== Species ==
These 23 species belong to the genus Mimopeus:

- Mimopeus buchanani (Broun, 1880)
- Mimopeus clarkei Watt, 1988
- Mimopeus convexus Watt, 1988
- Mimopeus costellus (Broun, 1905)
- Mimopeus elongatus (Breme, 1842)
- Mimopeus granulosus (Breme, 1842)
- Mimopeus humeralis (Bates, 1873)
- Mimopeus impressifrons (Bates, 1873)
- Mimopeus insularis Watt, 1988
- Mimopeus johnsi Watt, 1988
- Mimopeus lateralis (Broun, 1909)
- Mimopeus lewisianus (Sharp, 1903)
- Mimopeus neglectus Watt, 1988
- Mimopeus opaculus (Bates, 1873)
- Mimopeus parallelus Watt, 1988
- Mimopeus parvus Watt, 1988
- Mimopeus pascoei (Bates, 1873)
- Mimopeus rugosus (Bates, 1873)
- Mimopeus subcostatus (Sharp, 1903)
- Mimopeus thoracicus (Bates, 1873)
- Mimopeus tibialis (Bates, 1873)
- Mimopeus turbotti Watt, 1988
- Mimopeus vallis Watt, 1988
