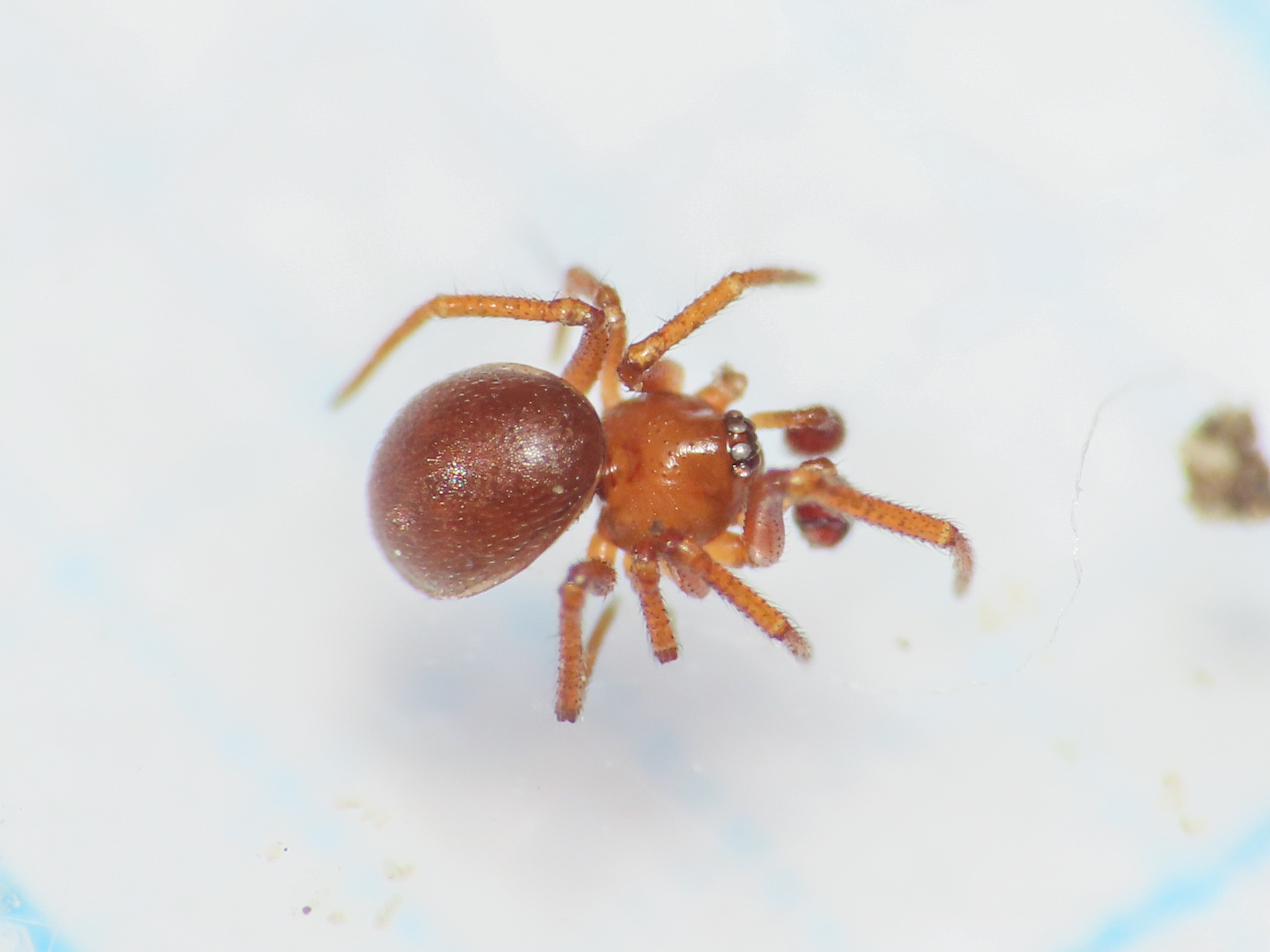
- Pholcomma gibbum

Scientific classification
- Kingdom: Animalia
- Phylum: Arthropoda
- Subphylum: Chelicerata
- Class: Arachnida
- Order: Araneae
- Infraorder: Araneomorphae
- Family: Theridiidae
- Genus: Pholcomma; Thorell, 1869

Type species
- P. gibbum (Westring, 1851)

Species
- 11, see text

Synonyms
- Ancylorrhanis Simon, 1894; Armigera Marples, 1956

= Pholcomma =

Genus of spiders

Pholcomma is a genus of comb-footed spiders that was first described by Tamerlan Thorell in 1869.

== Species ==
As of May 2020 it contains eleven species, found worldwide:

- Pholcomma antipodianum (Forster, 1955) – New Zealand (Antipodes Is.)
- Pholcomma barnesi Levi, 1957 – USA
- Pholcomma carota Levi, 1957 – USA
- Pholcomma gibbum (Westring, 1851) (type) – Europe, North Africa, Turkey, Azerbaijan, Iran?
- Pholcomma hickmani Forster, 1964 – New Zealand (Campbell Is.)
- Pholcomma hirsutum Emerton, 1882 – USA, Canada
- Pholcomma mantinum Levi, 1964 – Brazil
- Pholcomma micropunctatum (Mello-Leitão, 1941) – Argentina
- Pholcomma soloa (Marples, 1955) – Samoa, Niue
- Pholcomma tokyoense Ono, 2007 – Japan
- Pholcomma turbotti (Marples, 1956) – New Zealand

Formerly included:

- P. amamiense Yoshida, 1985 (Transferred to Phycosoma)
- P. japonicum Yoshida, 1985 (Transferred to Phycosoma)
- P. nigromaculatum Yoshida, 1987 (Transferred to Phycosoma)
- P. yunnanense Song & Zhu, 1994 (Transferred to Trogloneta)
