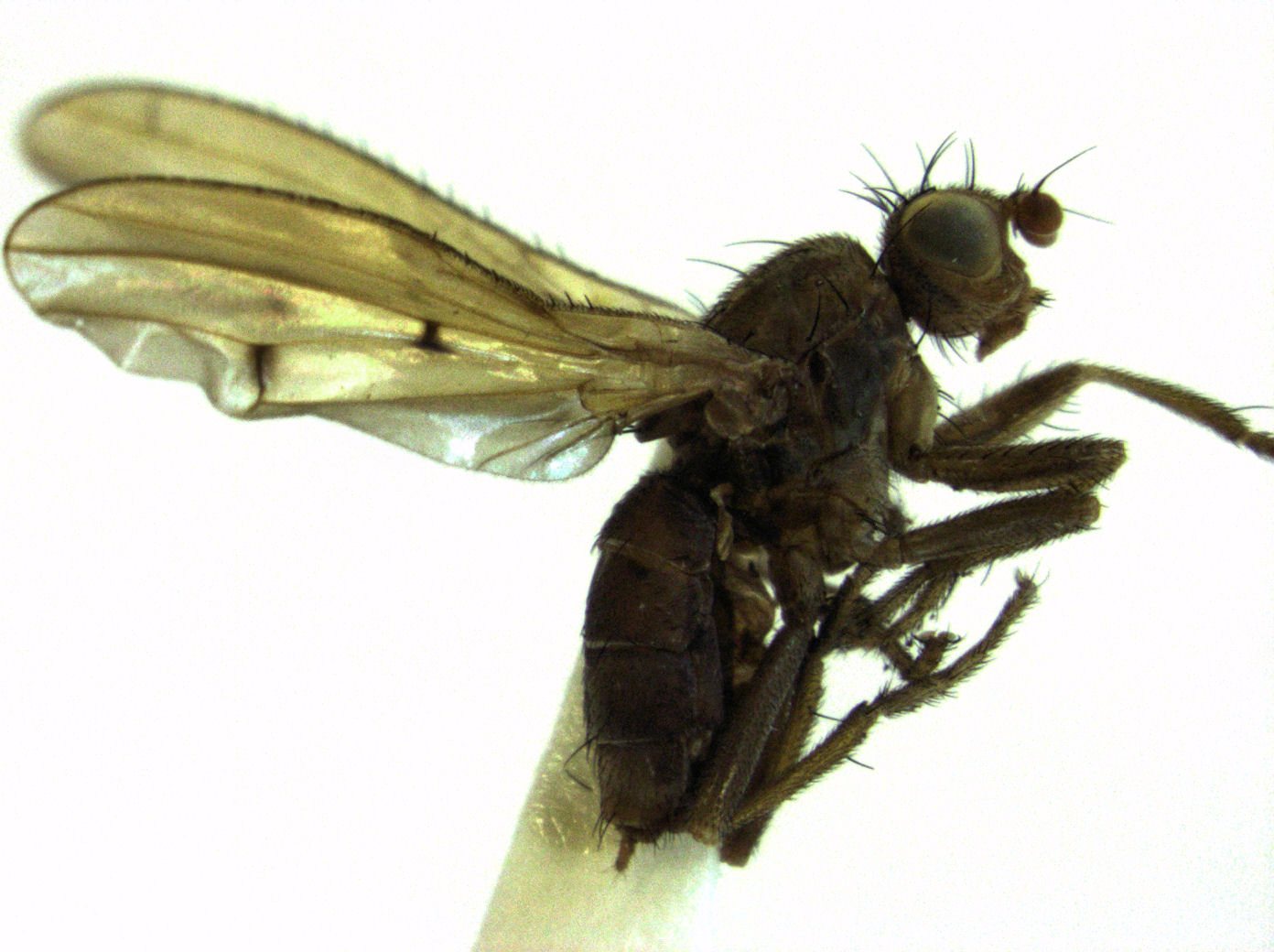
- Xenosciomyza turbotti

Scientific classification
- Domain: Eukaryota
- Kingdom: Animalia
- Phylum: Arthropoda
- Class: Insecta
- Order: Diptera
- Superfamily: Sciomyzoidea
- Family: Helosciomyzidae; Steyskal, 1965

Genera
- 11, see text

= Helosciomyzidae =

Family of flies

The Helosciomyzidae are a small family of flies found exclusively in the Southern Hemisphere. With the exception of the South American genus Sciogriphoneura, helosciomyzids occur only in Australia and New Zealand (including The Snares and the Auckland Islands).

== Taxonomy and history ==
The earliest grouping of helosciomyzid genera was as a subfamily of Sciomyzidae, Helosciomyzinae, proposed by George C. Steyskal in 1965 and which initially consisted of the genera Helosciomyza, Xenosciomyza, and Polytocus, with the monotypic genus Eurotocus added to this grouping by Steyskal in 1978. Helosciomyzinae was elevated to family rank by G. C. D. Griffiths in 1972, including the genera Huttonina and Prosochaeta, which Steyskal had previously classified as belonging to the sciomyzid subfamily Huttoninidae and which were later excluded from Helosciomyzidae in a 1981 revision of the family by Jeffrey K. Barnes. In this same 1981 revision Barnes added five new genera to Helosciomyzidae, with four of these new genera (Cobergius, Dasysciomyza, Napaeosciomyza, and Neosciomyza) including species previously placed in the genus Helosciomyza. The morphological differences between these genera are often minor. A 2012 paper by Australian entomologist David K. McAlpine theorised that Helosciomyzidae is likely most closely related to the sciomyzoid families Dryomyzidae or Helcomyzidae.

The earliest described species now placed in Helosciomyzidae are Helosciomyza fuscinevris and Cobergius vittatus, described by French entomologist Pierre-Justin-Marie Macquart in 1851 under the names Sciomyza fuscinevris and Helomyza vittata respectively, though these were not recognised as belonging to Helosciomyzidae and combined under their current names until 1992.

== Classification ==
This family includes the following genera and species:

- Cobergius Barnes, 1981

- C. vittatus (Macquart, 1851)

- Dasysciomyza Barnes, 1981

- D. setuligera (Malloch, 1922)
- D. pseudosetuligera (Tonnoir & Malloch, 1928)

- Eurotocus Steyskal in Steyskal & Knutson, 1979

- E. australis Steyskal in Steyskal & Knutson, 1979

- Helosciomyza Hendel, 1917

- H. anaxantha Steyskal in Steyskal & Knutson, 1979
- H. australica Steyskal in Steyskal & Knutson, 1979
- H. bickeli McAlpine, 2012
- H. driesseni McAlpine, 2012
- H. ferruginea Hendel, 1917
- H. fuscinervis (Macquart, 1851)
- H. macalpinei Steyskal in Steyskal & Knutson, 1979
- H. neboissi McAlpine, 2012
- H. obliqua McAlpine, 2012
- H. steyskali McAlpine, 2012
- H. subacuta McAlpine, 2012
- H. subalpina Tonnoir & Malloch, 1928

- Luta McAlpine, 2012

- L. luteipennis (Steyskal in Steyskal & Knutson, 1979)

- Napaeosciomyza Barnes, 1981

- N. rara (Hutton, 1901)
- N. spinicosta (Malloch, 1922)
- N. subspinicosta (Tonnoir & Malloch, 1928)

- Neosciomyza Barnes, 1981

- N. anhecta (Steyskal in Steyskal & Knutson, 1979)
- N. peckorum McAlpine, 2012

- Polytocus Lamb, 1909

- P. costatus Harrison, 1976
- P. spinicosta Lamb, 1909

- Sciogriphoneura Malloch, 1933

- S. brunnea Steyskal, 1977
- S. nigriventris Malloch, 1933

- Scordalus Barnes, 1981

- S. femoratus (Tonnoir & Malloch, 1928)

- Xenosciomyza Tonnoir & Malloch, 1928

- X. prima Tonnoir & Malloch, 1928
- X. turbotti Harrison, 1955
