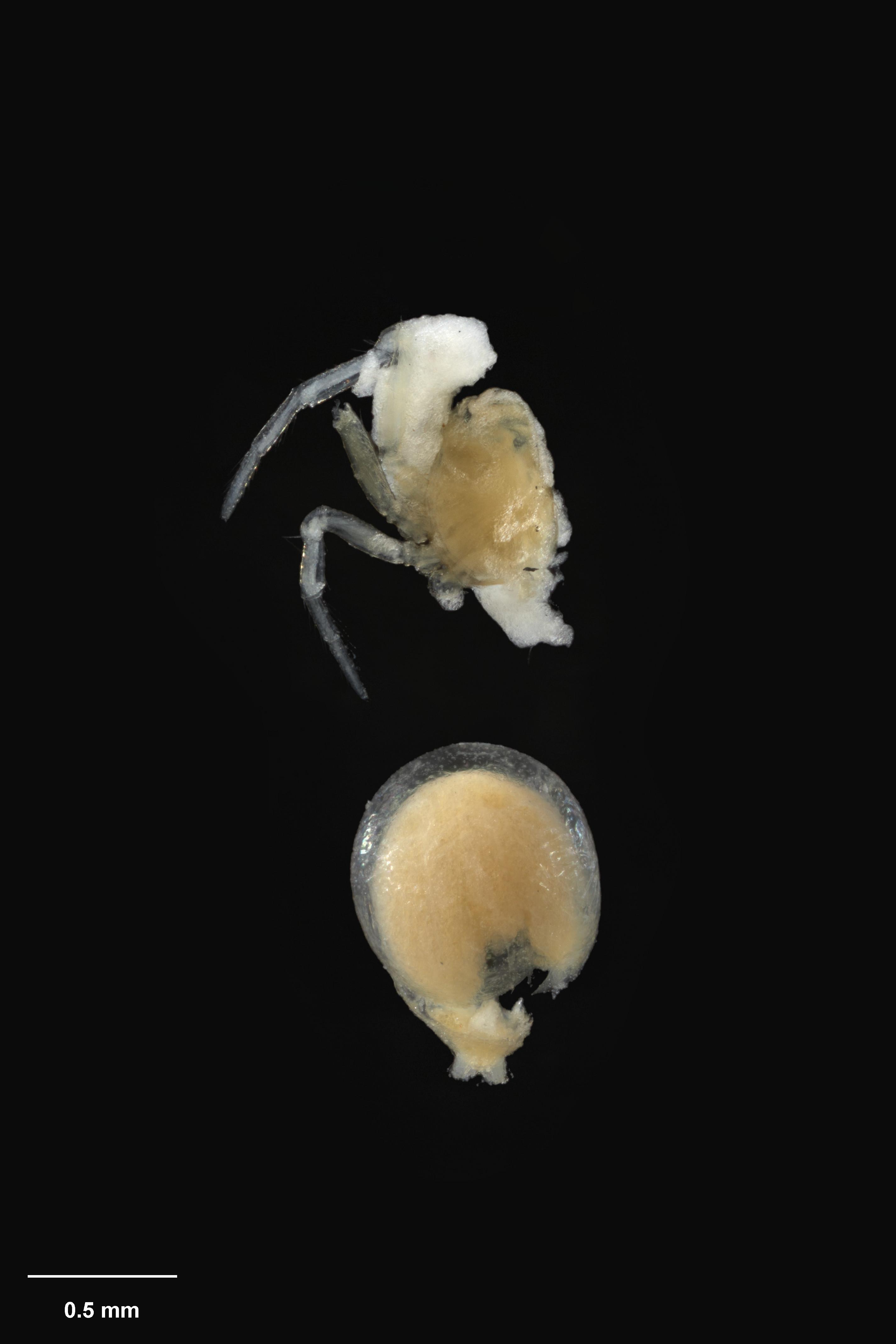

Conservation status
- Naturally Uncommon (NZ TCS)

Scientific classification
- Kingdom: Animalia
- Phylum: Arthropoda
- Subphylum: Chelicerata
- Class: Arachnida
- Order: Araneae
- Infraorder: Araneomorphae
- Family: Theridiidae
- Genus: Pholcomma
- Species: P. hickmani

Binomial name
- Pholcomma hickmani Forster, 1964

= Pholcomma hickmani =

Species of spider

Pholcomma hickmani is a species of cobweb spider that is endemic to New Zealand.

== Taxonomy ==
This species was described in 1964 by Ray Forster from a female specimen. The holotype is stored in Te Papa Museum under registration number AS.000039.

== Description ==
The female is recorded at 1.41mm in length. The cephalothorax and legs are yellow brown. The abdomen is grey.

== Distribution ==
This species is only known from Campbell Island, New Zealand.

== Conservation status ==
Under the New Zealand Threat Classification System, this species is listed as "Naturally Uncommon" with the qualifiers of "Island Endemic" and "One Location".
