= Graham Turbott =

New Zealand zoologist and museum administrator

Graham Turbott QSO
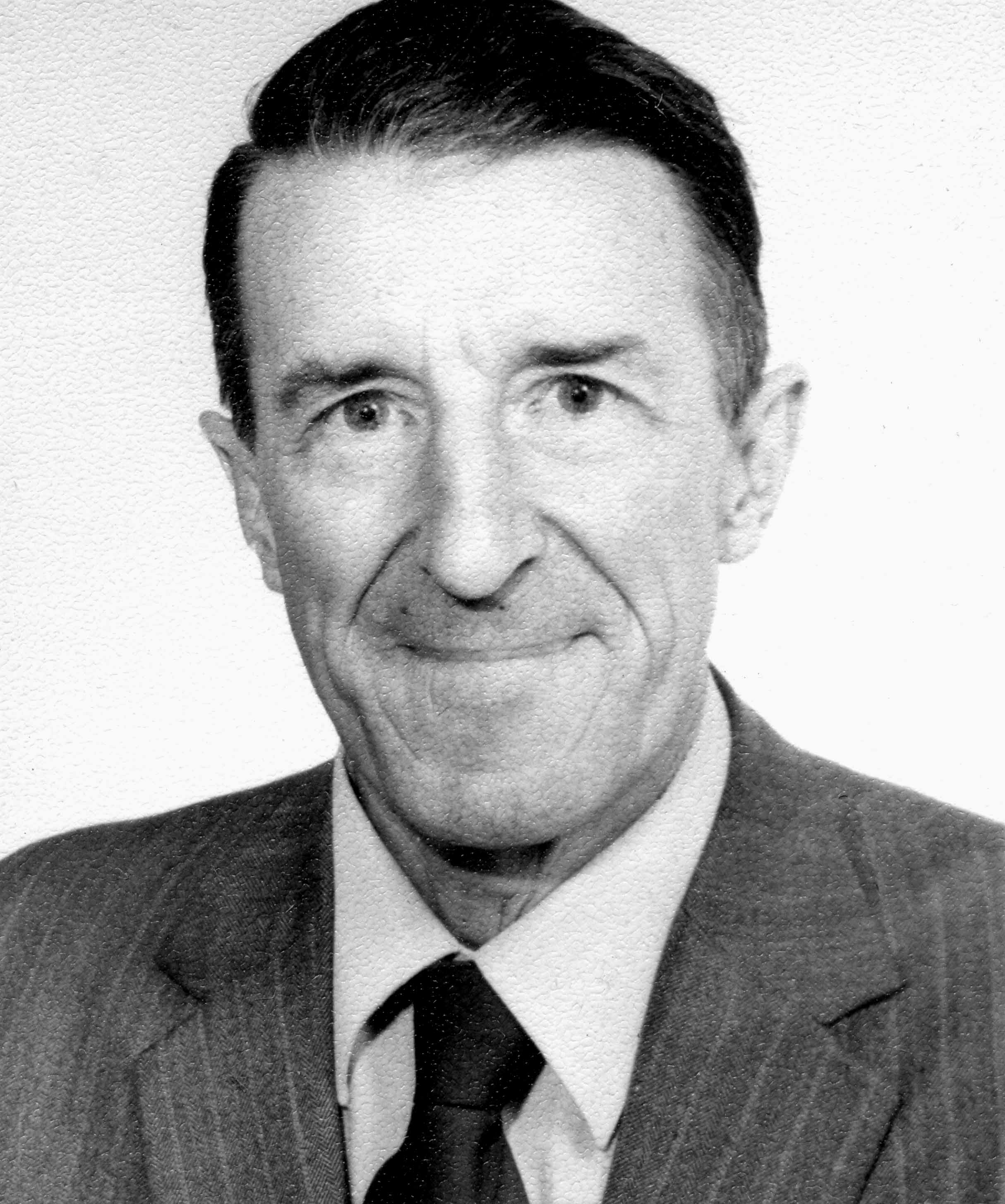
- Graham Turbott, 1975 (Note: Studio portrait of E.G. Turbott, scanned from his 1975 passport. Photographer unknown. First published in Notornis 62: 51–56 (2015))
- Born: Evan Graham Turbott; 27 May 1914; Stanley Bay, New Zealand
- Died: 12 December 2014 (aged 100); Auckland, New Zealand
- Education: Auckland University College (MSc)
- Spouse: Olwyn Mary Rutherford (m. 1940; died 1994)
- Scientific career
- Fields: Ornithology, zoology
- Workplaces: Auckland War Memorial Museum; Canterbury Museum
- Thesis: Some observations on the distribution and anatomy of Leiopelma hochstetteri Fitzinger (1937)
- Relatives: Ian Turbott (brother)

Evan Graham Turbott QSO (27 May 1914 – 12 December 2014) was a New Zealand ornithologist, zoologist, and museum administrator. He served as director of the Auckland Institute and Museum from 1964 to 1979.

== Early life and family ==
Born at Stanley Bay on Auckland's North Shore, Turbott was the eldest of the three sons of Thomas Turbott, headmaster of Grey Lynn School, and his wife Evangeline Alice Turbott (née Graham). His brothers included the diplomat and businessman Ian Turbott. He was educated at Stanley Bay School, Vauxhall School, and was a foundation pupil of Takapuna Grammar School. Turbott studied at Auckland Teachers' Training College and Auckland University College. He graduated from the latter institution with a Master of Science in zoology in 1938. His thesis was entitled Some observations on the distribution and anatomy of Leiopelma hochstetteri Fitzinger.

== Career ==
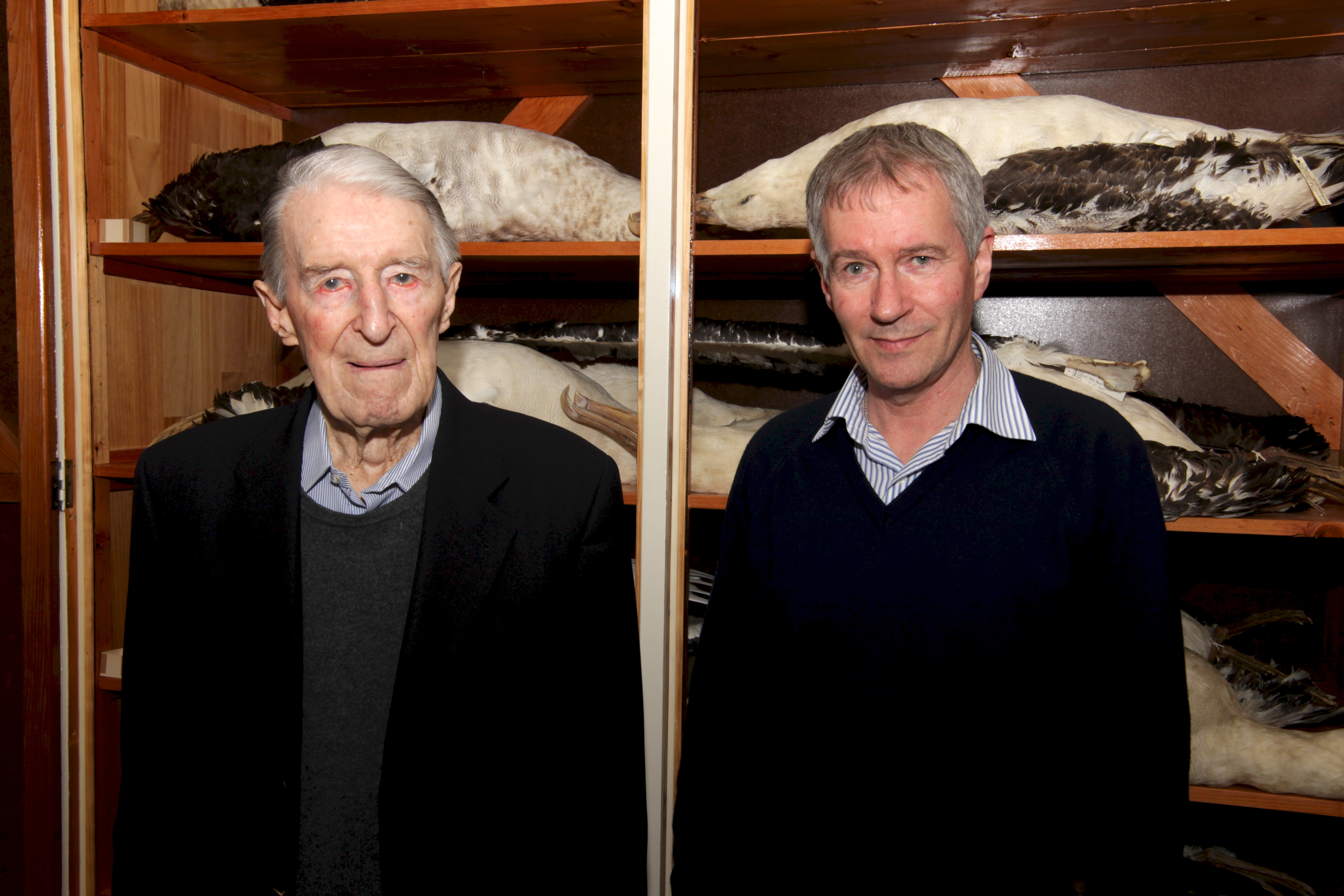
Turbott with zoologist Brian Gill at the Auckland War Memorial Museum in 2012

In 1937, Turbott was appointed as assistant zoologist at Auckland War Memorial Museum. On 7 September 1940, Turbott married the museum's ethnologist Olwyn Mary Rutherford at All Saints' Church, Howick. In 1943 Turbott volunteered to join the Royal New Zealand Air Force, and was posted to the meteorological section. In 1944 he spent a year on coast-watching duties in the subantarctic Auckland Islands as part of the Cape Expedition, which also included Charles Fleming and Robert Falla, but he also found time to pursue his interest in natural history. He later wrote about the experience in the book Year Away: Wartime coast watching on the Auckland Islands, 1944, published in 2002.

Turbott returned and continued at Auckland Museum. In 1948, Turbott described Archey's frog (Leiopelma archeyi), naming the species after museum director Gilbert Archey. In 1957, Turbott left to become the assistant director of Canterbury Museum, Christchurch. He returned in 1964 to take up the post of director of the Auckland Institute and Museum, succeeding Archey. He remained there until he retired in August 1979, when he was named as the museum's director emeritus.

Turbott wrote or co-authored several ornithological works, including New Zealand bird life (1947), Buller's birds of New Zealand (2nd updated edition, 1967, as editor), A field guide to the birds of New Zealand and outlying Islands (1970, with Robert Falla), The new guide to the birds of New Zealand and outlying islands (1979, with Falla), Collins guide to the birds of New Zealand and outlying islands (1981, with Falla), Birds of New Zealand (1990, with Falla), and Checklist of the birds of New Zealand and the Ross Dependency, Antarctica (1990).

A founding member of the Ornithological Society of New Zealand, Turbott served as its president from 1949 to 1952, North Island vice president from 1947 to 1949 and 1957 to 1958, and a councillor between 1953 and 1955.

Turbott died on 12 December 2014.

== Honours and awards ==
In the 1978 New Year Honours, Turbott was appointed a Companion of the Queen's Service Order for public services, in recognition of his role as director of the Auckland Institute and Museum. He was bestowed with the Robert Falla Memorial Award by the Ornithological Society of New Zealand in 1988, and made a fellow of the same organisation in 1997. In 2014, Turbott was the recipient of a lifetime achievement award from Auckland Museum.

== Honorific eponynyms ==
There are 15 species, mostly invertebrates from New Zealand offshore islands, that were collected by Turbott have been named in his honour:

- Allodiscus turbotti
- Anagotus turbotti
- Apatochernes turbotti
- Aucklandobius turbotti
- Cambridgea turbotti
- Cermatulus nasalis turbotti
- Dicyrtomina turbotti
- Exeiratus turbotti
- Mimopeus turbotti
- Paralaoma turbotti
- Pholcomma turbotti
- Proterodesma turbotti
- Pseudopisalia turbotti
- Subantarctia turbotti
- Xenosciomyza turbotti

Additionally, the genus Turbottoplectron, which has since been synonymised with Pachyrhamma, was named after Turbott.

Lake Turbott, on Adams Island in the Auckland Islands, was also named after Turbott.

== Selected bibliography ==
- Turbott, E. G. (1948). "Effect of Goats on Great Island, Three Kings, with descriptions of Vegetation Quadrats". Records of the Auckland Institute and Museum. 3: 253–272. ISSN 0067-0464. JSTOR 42906015. Wikidata Q58676660.
- Turbott, E. G.; Buddle, G.A. (1948). "Birds of the Three Kings Islands". Records of the Auckland Institute and Museum. 3: 319–336. ISSN 0067-0464. JSTOR 42906021. Wikidata Q58676672.
- Powell, A. W. B.; Brooker, S.G.; Troup, C.O.; Turbott, E. G. (January 1967), Powell, A. W. B. (ed.), The Centennial History of the Auckland Institute and Museum (PDF), Auckland Institute and Museum, OCLC 2436497, S2CID 160389298, Wikidata Q115613084
- Falla, R. A.; Sibson, R. B.; Turbott, E. G.; Power, Elaine (1979). The new guide to the birds of New Zealand and the outlying islands. Auckland: Collins. ISBN 978-0-00-216928-8. LCCN 80457005. OCLC 8883987. Wikidata Q130243003.
- Turbott, E.G.; Checklist Committee (1990). Checklist of the birds of New Zealand and the Ross Dependency, Antarctica (1990) (3rd ed.). Auckland: Random House. ISBN 978-1-86941-082-7. OCLC 22871733. OL 53775532M. Wikidata Q112189585.
