= Exeiratus turbotti =

Scientific classification
- Kingdom: Animalia
- Phylum: Arthropoda
- Class: Insecta
- Order: Coleoptera
- Suborder: Polyphaga
- Infraorder: Cucujiformia
- Family: Curculionidae
- Genus: Exeiratus
- Species: E. turbotti

Binomial name
- Exeiratus turbotti (Brookes, 1951)

Synonyms
- Austroinsulus turbotti Brookes, 1951

Species of springtail

Exeiratus turbotti is a species of weevil belonging to the family Curculionidae. The species was first described by Albert Eugene Brookes in 1951, and is endemic to the Auckland Islands in New Zealand.

== Taxonomy ==
The species was identified by Albert Eugene Brookes in 1951, who named the species Austroinsulus turbotti and created the genus Austroinsulus solely for this species. The species was described based on a holotype collected from a dead tree stump on Auckland Island by Evan Graham Turbott in 1944. Brookes named the species after Turbott. In 1964, Guillermo Kuschel recombined the species, placing it within the genus Austroinsulus.

== Description ==
E. turbotti has a dark colour with sparse yellowish scales, and is approximately 4 mm (0.16 in) in length. It can be distinguished from E. laqueorum due to its glossy black colour and coarsely punctate abdomen.

== Distribution and habitat ==
The species is endemic to New Zealand, found on in the Auckland Islands..
