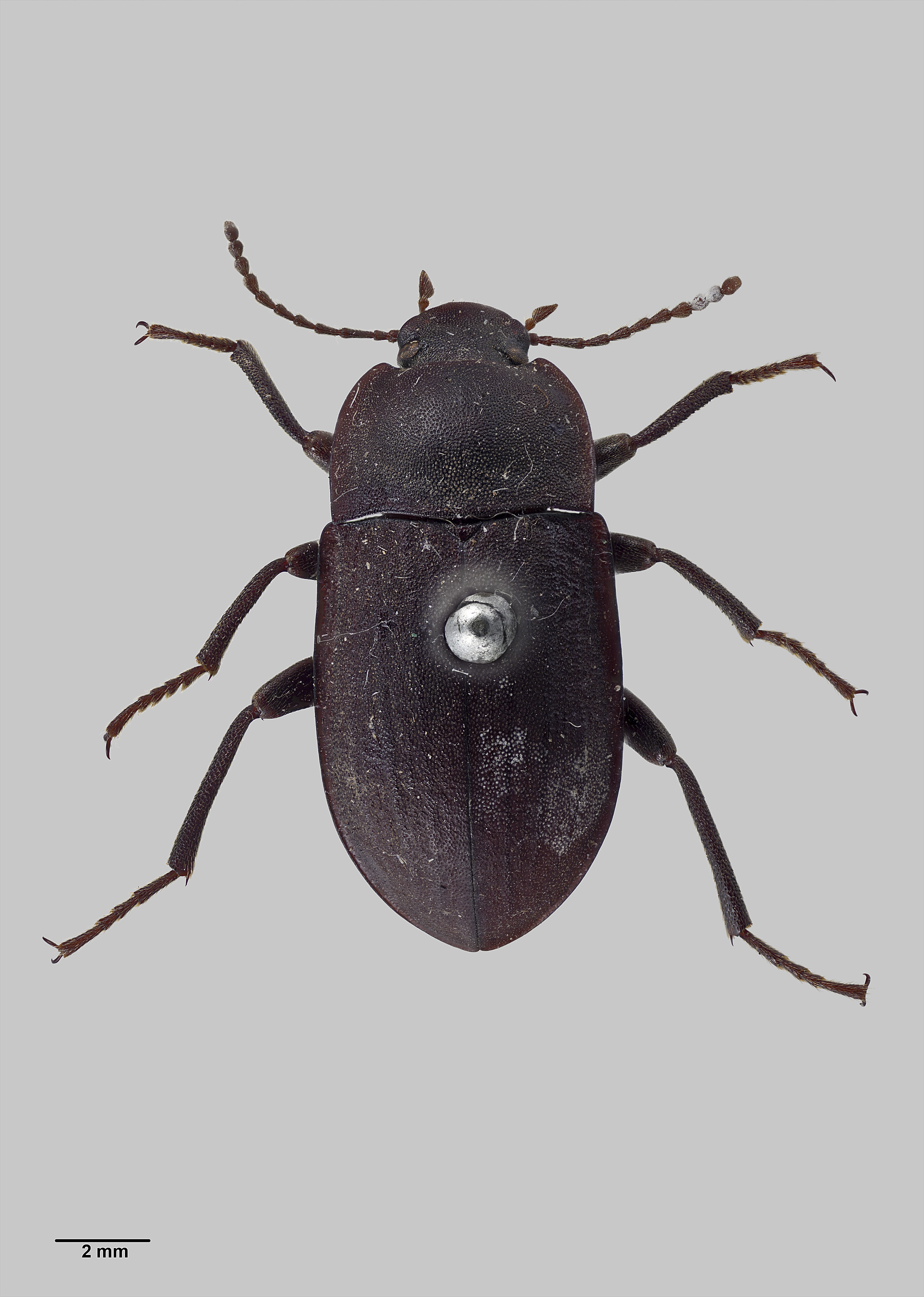
- Mimopeus clarkei collected from the Awatere River in the Marlborough Region, New Zealand

Scientific classification
- Domain: Eukaryota
- Kingdom: Animalia
- Phylum: Arthropoda
- Class: Insecta
- Order: Coleoptera
- Suborder: Polyphaga
- Infraorder: Cucujiformia
- Family: Tenebrionidae
- Genus: Mimopeus
- Species: M. clarkei

Binomial name
- Mimopeus clarkei Watt, 1988

= Mimopeus clarkei =

Species of beetle

Mimopeus clarkei is a species of darkling beetle in the subfamily Tenebrioninae, first described by J. C. Watt in 1988. The species is approximately 12.1mm in length and 6.4mm in width. Specimens were found in the Awatere Valley and Avon Valley of the Marlborough Region, New Zealand, underneath stones and bracken fern. The species was named after C.E. Clarke, who collected beetle and lepidoptera specimens for the Auckland Museum.
