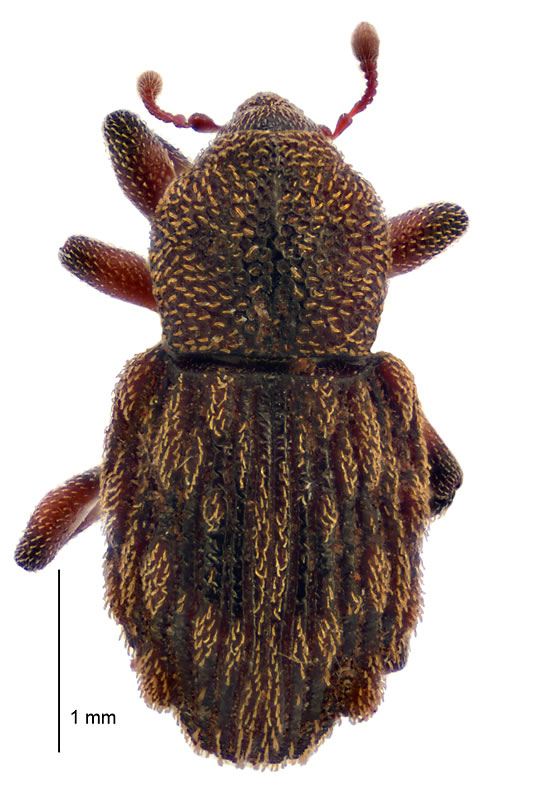
- Exeiratus setarius

Scientific classification
- Domain: Eukaryota
- Kingdom: Animalia
- Phylum: Arthropoda
- Class: Insecta
- Order: Coleoptera
- Suborder: Polyphaga
- Infraorder: Cucujiformia
- Family: Curculionidae
- Genus: Exeiratus; T.Broun, 1914

Species
- See text

Synonyms
- Austroinsulus Brookes, 1951

= Exeiratus =

Genus of insects

Exeiratus is a genus of weevils belonging to the family Curculionidae. The genus was first described by Thomas Broun in 1914, who named Exeiratus setarius as the type species.

== Distribution ==
The genus is native to Australia and New Zealand.

== Species ==
- Exeiratus laqueorum Kuschel, 1964
- Exeiratus setarius Broun, 1914
- Exeiratus turbotti (Brookes, 1951)
