= Gourlayia =

Scientific classification
- Domain: Eukaryota
- Kingdom: Animalia
- Phylum: Arthropoda
- Class: Insecta
- Order: Coleoptera
- Suborder: Adephaga
- Family: Carabidae
- Tribe: Pterostichini
- Subtribe: Pterostichina
- Genus: Gourlayia; Britton, 1964
- Species: G. regia

Binomial name
- Gourlayia regia Britton, 1964

Genus of beetles

Gourlayia is a genus of carabids in the beetle family Carabidae. This genus has a single species, Gourlayia regia. It is found in New Zealand.
