= Joachim Illies =

German biologist, entomologist and author

- Born: March 23, 1925
- Died: June 3, 1982 (aged 57)
- Occupations: Biologist, entomologist and author

Joachim Illies (March 23, 1925 - June 3, 1982) was a German biologist, entomologist, limnologist and author.

== Biography ==
Joachim Illies studied biology at the University of Götting and Kiel. He was the leader of the Max-Planck-Institute of limnology in Plön, where he worked for 31 years, an honorary professor for zoology at the University of Gießen, and editor-in-chief of the journal Aquatic Insects.

Primarily he was engaged in limnological subjects. In addition to his scientific activities, as a councilor of the Evangelical Church in Germany he published around forty popular books on themes concerning anthropology and theology.

Illes became an authority on the Plecoptera of the Southern Hemisphere.

Illies died suddenly on 3 June 1982.

== Books ==
- Adams Handwerk, Furche 1967
- Noahs Arche, Kosmos 1968
- Wissenschaft als Heilserwartung, Furche 1969
- Die Affen und wir, ro-ro-ro-tele 1970
- Zoologie des Menschen, Piper 1971
- Feigenblatt und Lorbeer, Schünemann 1971
- Die Sache mit dem Apfel, Herder 1972, mit Beiträgen von Heinrich Spaemann, Christa Meves, Ernst Bloch u.a.
- Für eine menschenwürdige Zukunft, Herder 1972
- Hoffnung auf Naturwissenschaft, Die Waage, Zürich 1972
- Biologie und Menschenbild, Freiburg im Breisgau, Basel, Wien (Herder) 1975, ISBN 3-451-07526-1
- Das Geheimnis des Lebendigen: Leben u. Werk des Biologen Adolf Portmann, München 1976 (Kindler), ISBN 3-463-00673-1
- Die andere Seite der Biologie, Freiburg im Breisgau, Basel, Wien 1978 (Herder), ISBN 3-451-07677-2
- Kulturbiologie des Menschen: Der Mensch zwischen Gesetz und Freiheit, München 1978 (Piper), ISBN 3-492-00482-2
- Das Geheimnis des grünen Planeten, Frankfurt / Main 1982 (Umschau-Verlag), ISBN 3-524-69038-6
- Der Jahrhundert-Irrtum: Würdigung und Kritik des Darwinismus, Frankfurt / Main 1983 (Umschau-Verlag), ISBN 3-524-69046-7

== Literature ==
- Brockhaus Enzyklopädie, Neunzehnte, völlig neu bearbeitete Auflage, Band 10, Seite 393, Artikel „Illies, Joachim“, Mannheim 1989, ISBN 3-7653-1110-3
- Carsten Bresch: "Nachruf auf Joachim Illies", in AGEMUS, Juni 1982, p. 25 f, Freiburg im Breisgau
