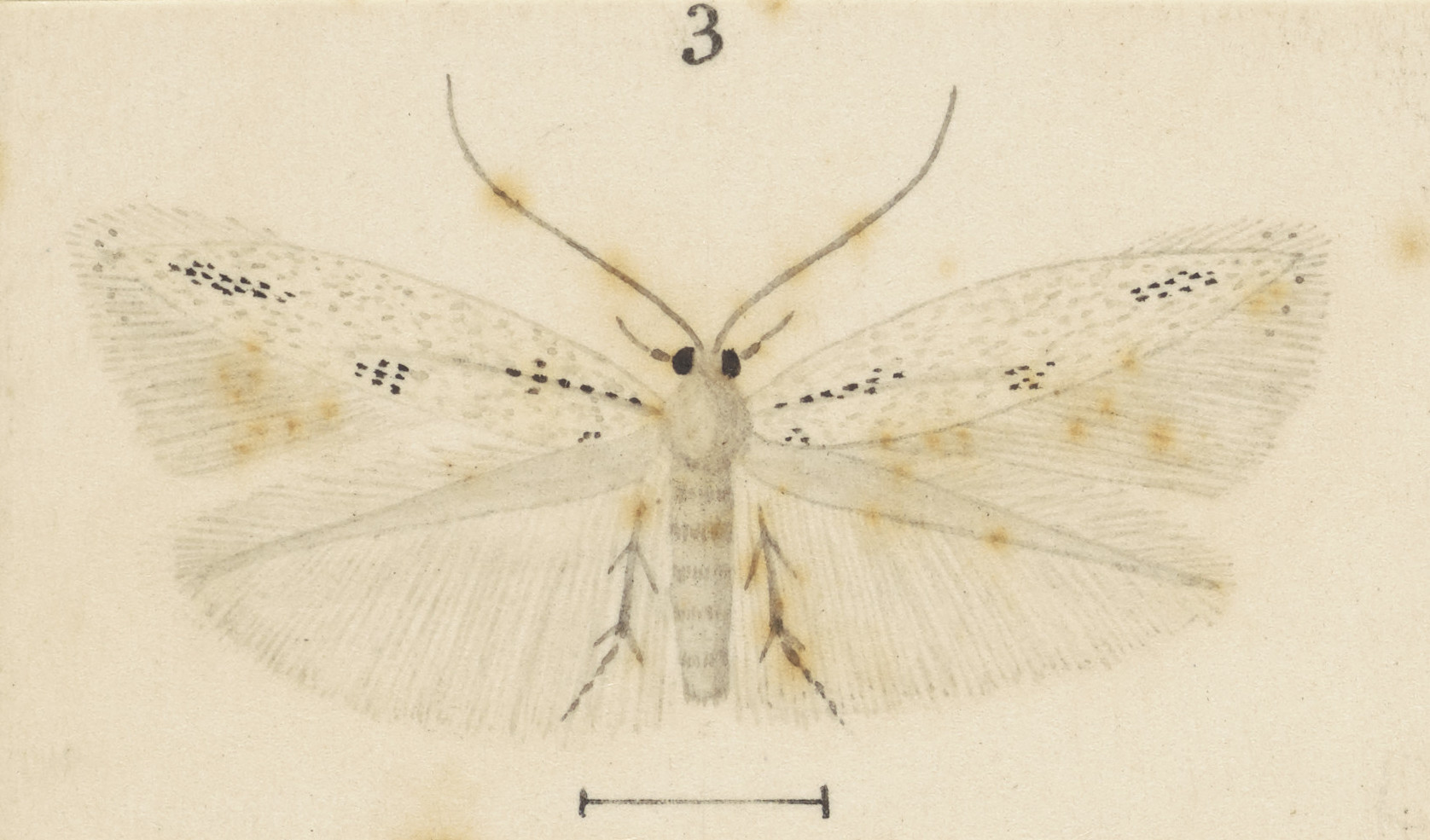

Scientific classification
- Kingdom: Animalia
- Phylum: Arthropoda
- Class: Insecta
- Order: Lepidoptera
- Family: Elachistidae
- Genus: Elachista
- Species: E. exaula

Binomial name
- Elachista exaula Meyrick, 1889

= Elachista exaula =

Species of moth

Elachista exaula is a moth in the family Elachistidae. It was described by Edward Meyrick in 1889. It is found in New Zealand.

The wingspan is 9–10 mm. The forewings are pale whitish-ochreous, irrorated with grey, more closely and suffusedly on the costa and more yellowish-tinged in the disc. There is a slender black median streak from near the base to before the middle and a black elongate dot in the disc above the middle, and a second, larger and more distinctly elongate, below it. There is also a slender black median streak from two-thirds to near the apex. The hindwings are grey.
