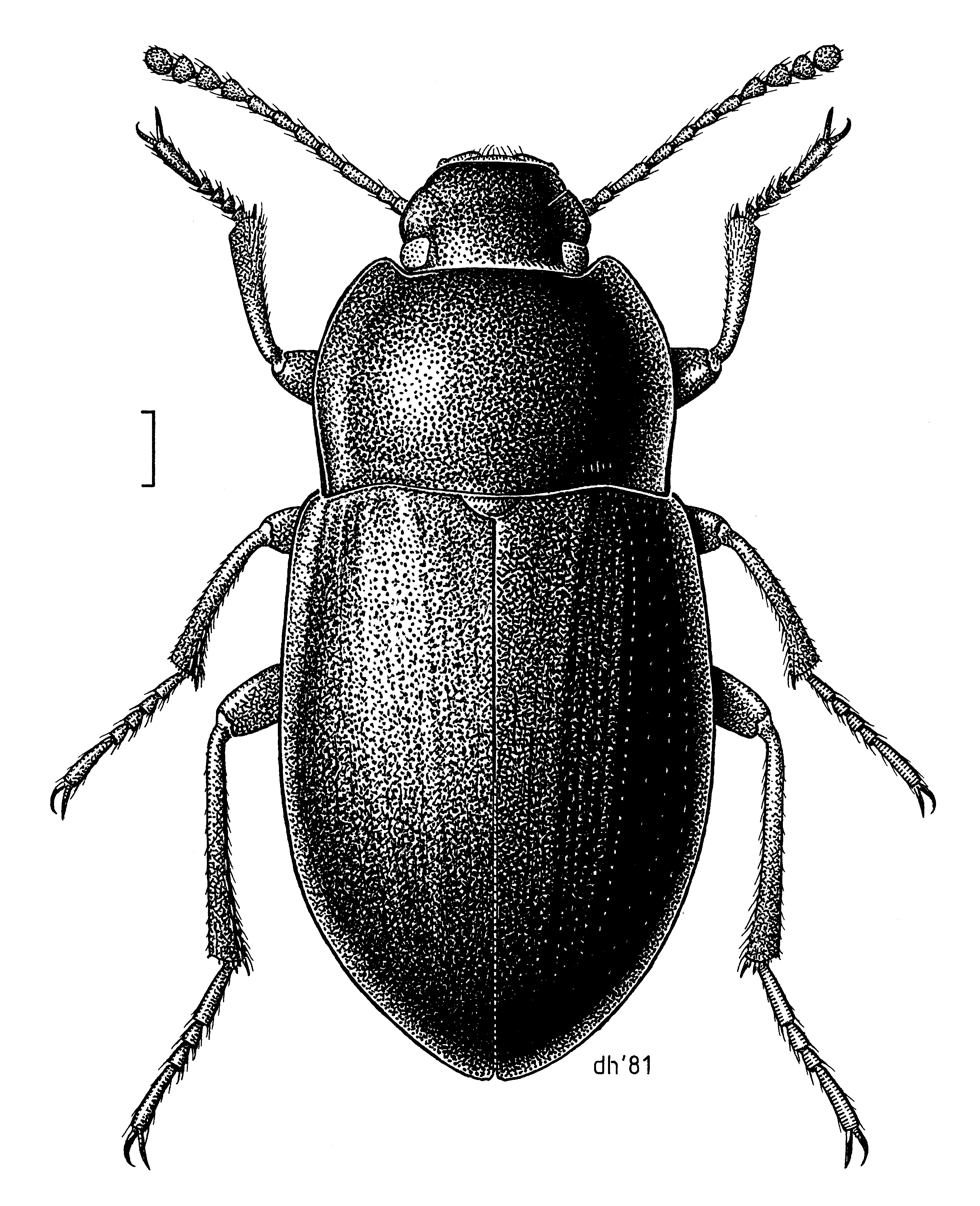
- Mimopeus elongatus illustration by Des Helmore.

Scientific classification
- Domain: Eukaryota
- Kingdom: Animalia
- Phylum: Arthropoda
- Class: Insecta
- Order: Coleoptera
- Suborder: Polyphaga
- Infraorder: Cucujiformia
- Family: Tenebrionidae
- Genus: Mimopeus
- Species: M. elongatus

Binomial name
- Mimopeus elongatus (Breme, 1842)

Synonyms
- Cilibe elongata Breme, 1842; Mimopeus phosphugoides White, 1846; Mimopeus amaroides Pascoe, 1866; Mimopeus granulipennis Bates, 1873; Mimopeus huttoni Sharp, 1878; Mimopeus marginalis Broun, 1893; Mimopeus meridionalis Sharp, 1903

= Mimopeus elongatus =

Species of beetle

Mimopeus elongatus is a species of darkling beetle in the subfamily Tenebrioninae, first described by Ferdinando Arborio Gattinara di Breme in 1842, who considered it a type of Cilibe.

The species is found on the coast of the North Island of New Zealand in sand dunes, amongst Muehlenbeckia complexa and boulders on beaches, or around boulders in the Auckland volcanic field. The beetles are a reddish brown or black colour, with a shiny underside, with adults measuring approximately 11–15 mm in length and 5.3–7.3 mm in width. The species is predated upon by the polynesian rat and brown rats.
