= John Charles Watt (entomologist) =

New Zealand entomologist

- Born: 31 January 1936; England
- Died: 16 April 2006 (aged 70); Auckland, New Zealand
- Education: University of Auckland, Oxford University
- Awards: New Zealand National Research Fellowship
- Scientific career
- Fields: Entomology
- Workplaces: Department of Scientific and Industrial Research

John Charles Watt (31 January 1936 – 16 April 2006) was a New Zealand entomologist who made significant contributions to the study of New Zealand darkling beetles. Watt was born in England and emigrated to New Zealand while a child. He was educated at the University of Auckland where he obtained an master's degree with honours in zoology. He then travelled to the University of Oxford where he obtain a doctorate.

He was a participant in the 1970 Three Kings Islands expedition.
