= Manawatāwhi / Three Kings Islands =

Island group near Cape Reinga, New Zealand

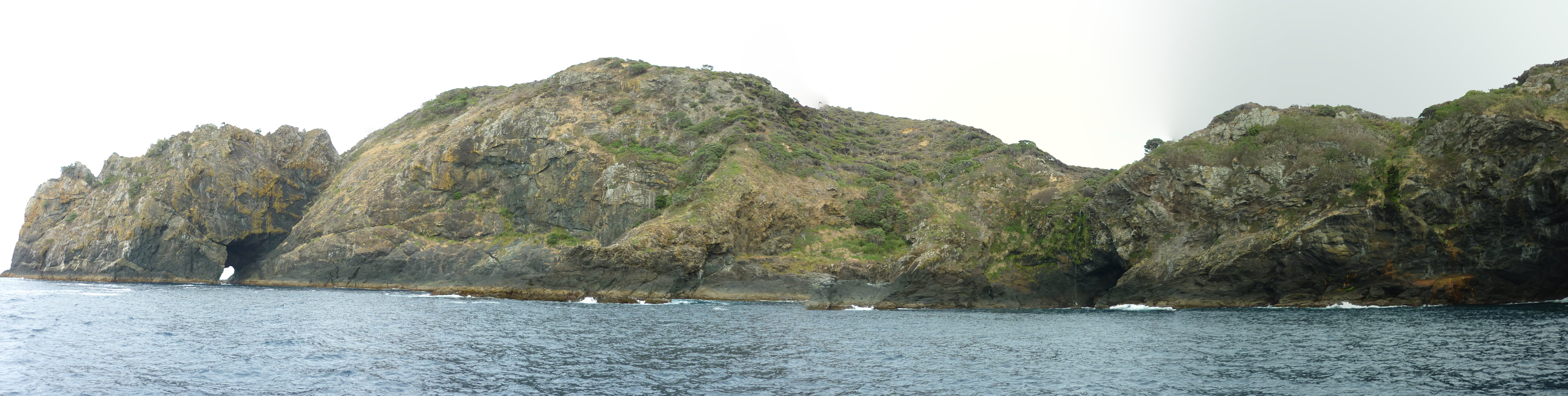
- Tasman Bay, on Manawatāwhi / Great Island

- Map of the Manawatāwhi / Three Kings Islands

- Location of the Manawatāwhi / Three Kings Islands in New Zealand

Geography
- Location: South Pacific Ocean
- Coordinates: 34°09′14″S 172°8′24″E
- Total islands: 13
- Area: 6.85 km^{2} (2.64 sq mi)
- Highest elevation: 295 m (968 ft)

Administration
- New Zealand

Demographics
- Population: 0

The Manawatāwhi / Three Kings Islands (Manawatāwhi is also the Māori name for the largest island) are a group of 13 uninhabited islands about 55 kilometres (34 mi) northwest of Cape Reinga, New Zealand, where the South Pacific Ocean and Tasman Sea converge. They measure 6.85 km^{2} (2.64 sq mi) in area. The islands are on a submarine plateau, the Three Kings Bank, and are separated from the New Zealand mainland by an 8 km wide, 200 to 300 m deep submarine trough. Therefore, despite relative proximity to the mainland, the islands are listed with the New Zealand Outlying Islands. The islands are an immediate part of New Zealand, but not part of any region or district, but instead Area Outside Territorial Authority, like all the other outlying islands except the Solander Islands.

== History ==
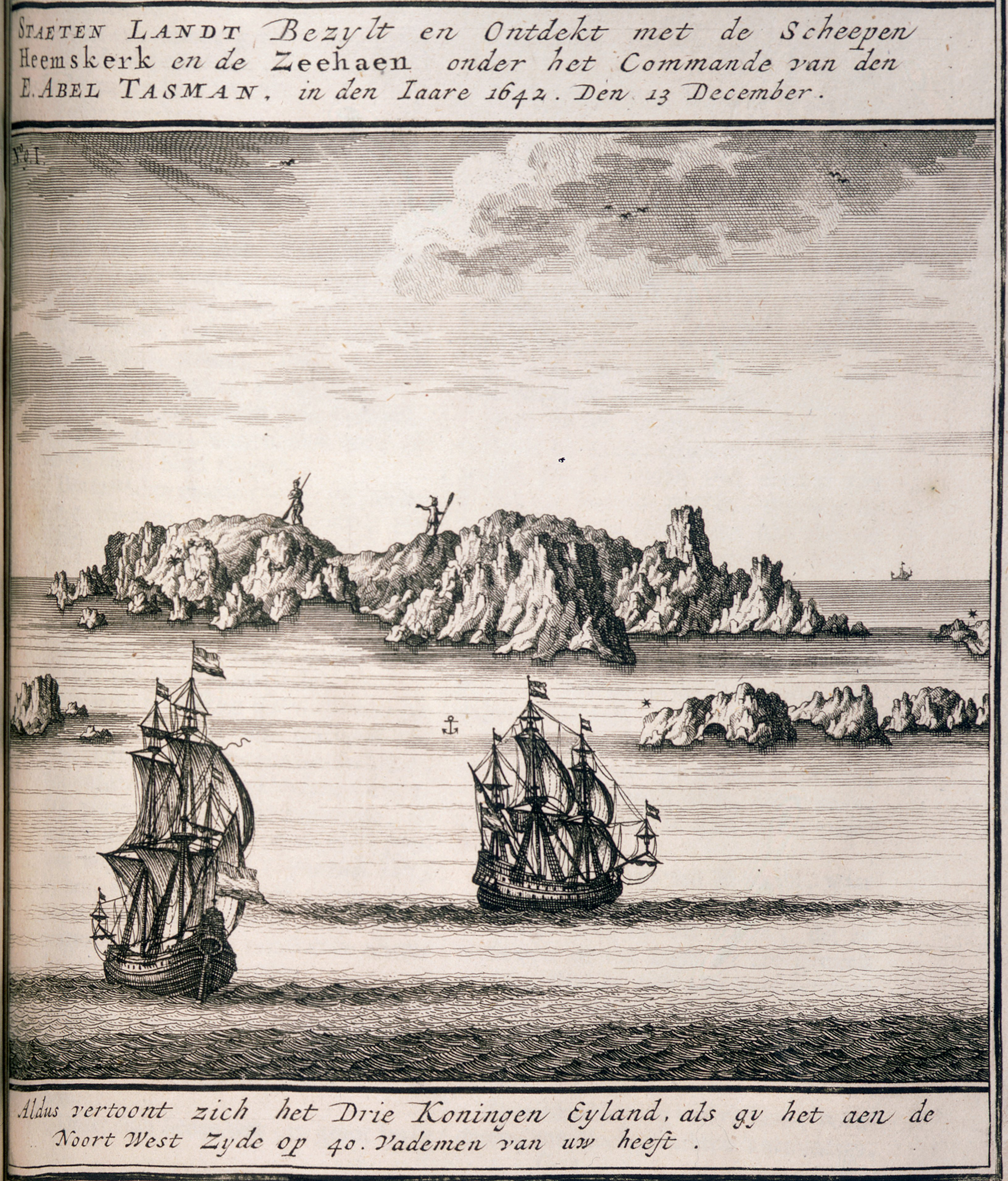
1643 engraving of a sketch by Tasman's crew member Isaac Gilsemans showing the islands from the north-west

During the Last Glacial Maximum when sea levels were over 100 metres lower than present day levels, most offshore islands of New Zealand were connected to the mainland. Manawatāwhi / Three Kings Islands, while connected to each other, were not connected to the rest of New Zealand. Sea levels began to rise 7,000 years ago, separating the individual islands in the group.

Manawatāwhi was traditionally settled by Muriwhenua Māori. In Māori mythology, Ōhau (West Island) is the final glimpse of New Zealand seen by departing spirits, after leaving the world at Cape Reinga / Te Rerenga Wairua. Some Te Aupōuri traditions associate the name of the island, Manawatāwhi ("panting breath"), with the ancestor Rauru, who swam to the islands and arrived exhausted. Members of Ngāti Kurī would periodically come to the islands as a refuge during times of warfare, and to harvest hāpuku, seabirds and eggs.

Most of the larger islands were inhabited, and the Great Island was cleared by Māori of vegetation to grow tuber crops such as kūmara. No defensive pā sites are found on the island, likely as the people who lived on Manawatāwhi did not feel threatened due to the islands' distance from the mainland.

Dutch explorer Abel Tasman bestowed the name Drie Koningen Eyland (Three Kings Island) on 6 January 1643, three weeks after he became the first European known to have seen New Zealand. Tasman anchored at the islands when searching for water. As it was the Twelfth Night feast of the Epiphany, the day the biblical three kings known as the wise men visited Christ the child, he named the main island accordingly. Tasman also named a prominent cape Cape Maria van Diemen, after the wife of Anthony van Diemen, Governor-General of the Dutch East Indies (now Indonesia). These are the only two geographic features in New Zealand to retain the names given to them by Abel Tasman. Tasman noted a group of 30–35 inhabitants and gardens on the island when attempting to come ashore to replenish water supplies, and saw no trees on the island. Since Tasman's visit, several European ships sighted the island, such as French botanist Jacques Labillardière on board the Recherche in 1793.

In the late 1700s, a party of mainland Te Aupōuri led by Taiakiaki travelled to the islands and killed the approximate 100 inhabitants, led by Toumaramara. Between 1800 and 1830 Te Aupōuri visited sporadically, however did not settle permanently. Tame Porena (also known as Tom Bowline) married Taiakiaki's granddaughter, and settled on the islands with his family of twelve children in the 1830s and 1840s, establishing large gardens, until starvation forced them to relocate to the mainland. Since then, nobody has settled on the islands permanently. Botanist Thomas Frederic Cheeseman visited the islands in 1887 and 1889, documenting the plant species present on the islands for the first time. Cheeseman noted that the Great Island had begun to reforest since Māori settlement.

The islands were purchased by the New Zealand government in 1908 from seven Māori people, and declared an animal sanctuary in 1930. A population of goats (left on the Manawatāwhi Island in November 1889 as a food source for shipwrecked people) had run rampant, reaching numbers of 300–400 by 1900. This led Baden Powell of the Auckland War Memorial Museum, who visited in a group, to petition the government to deal with the goat population. In 1946 the goat population were shot and removed from the island, leading to the regeneration of forest on Manawatāwhi. However, 50 species described by Cheeseman in the 1880s have not been described again, and by the 1980s two plant species were only represented by one wild specimen. In 1956, the islands were declared a reserve for the preservation of flora and fauna.

There have been several notable research expeditions that have concentrated on studying the fauna and flora of the Three Kings island group including one in 1970.

== Geography ==
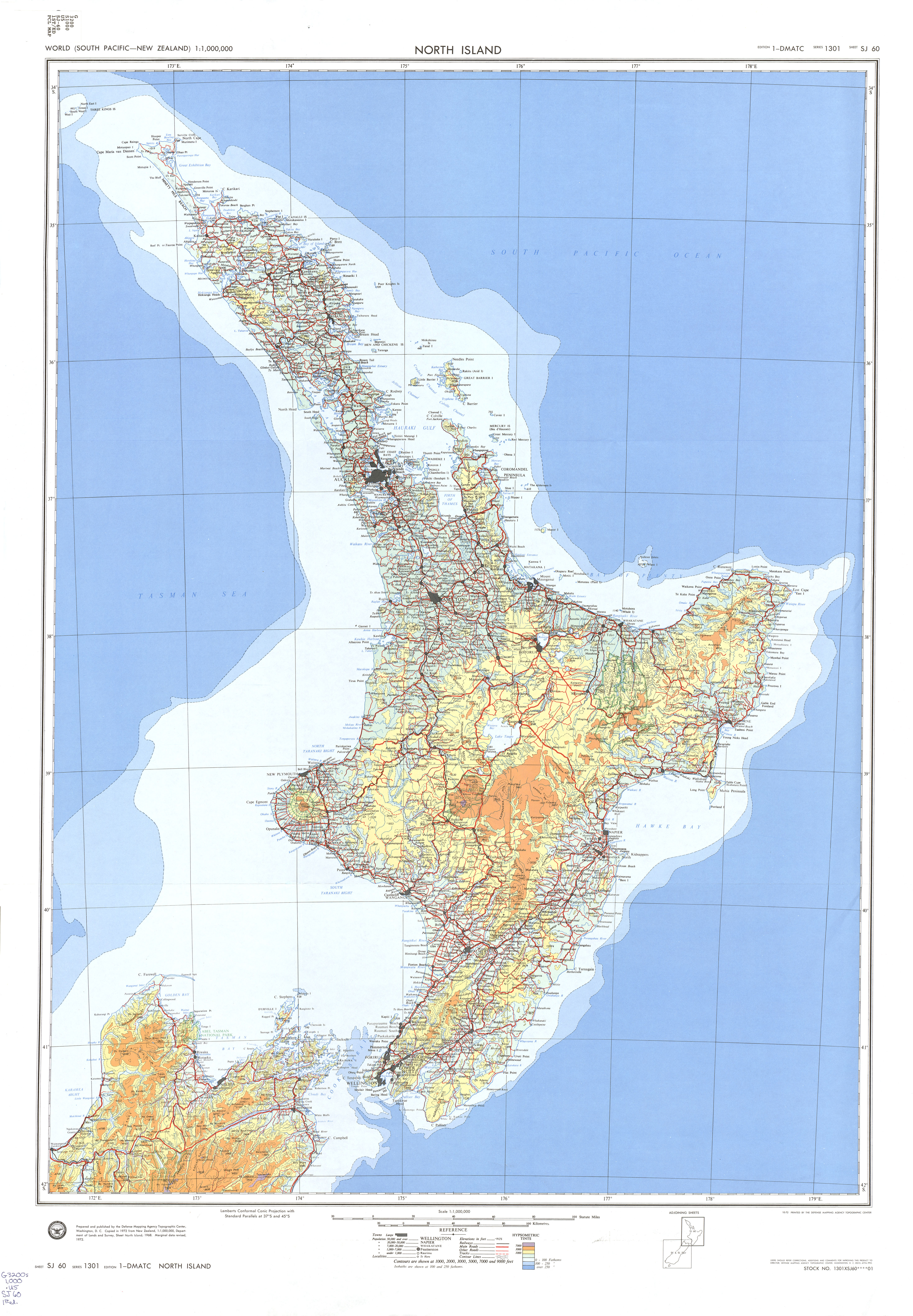
Map including the Three Kings Islands (top left) (DMA, 1972)

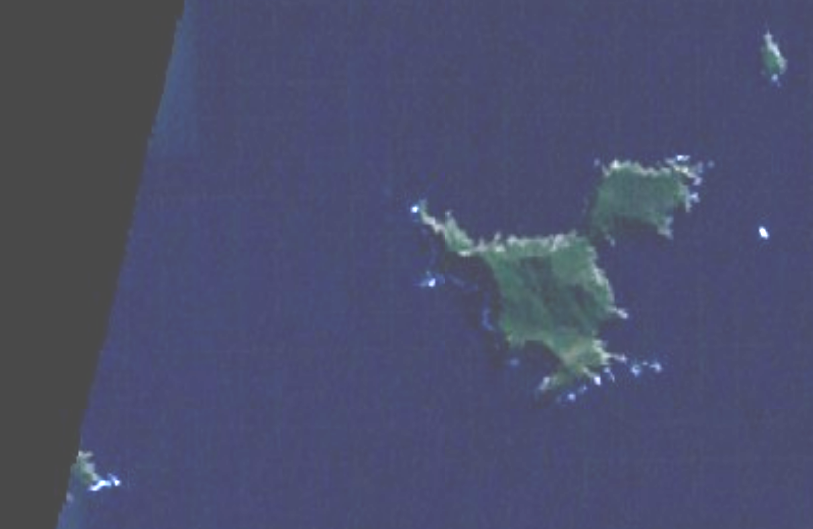
Satellite photograph of the islands by NASA

The Three Kings group falls into two subgroups with four main inhospitable islands and a number of smaller rocks on a submarine plateau called King Bank which rises out of extremely deep water. There are no beaches. The surrounding sea has very clear visibility and contains teeming fish life, attracting hundreds of divers. Another attraction is the wreck of the Elingamite which foundered there on 9 November 1902.

=== King Group ===
==== Manawatāwhi / Great Island ====
With an area of 4.04 square kilometres (1.56 sq mi), Manawatāwhi / Great Island is by far the largest island of the group. A northeastern peninsula, with an area of about 1 km^{2}, is almost cut off by a 200 m wide but more than 80 m high isthmus formed by North West Bay and South East Bay. The island reaches an elevation of 295 m in the western part, while the peninsula is up to 184 m high near its western cliffs. The southern portion consists of the Tasman Valley, a series of rolling hills that drain into the Tasman Stream. Most of the Māori archaeological features on the islands are found in this area.

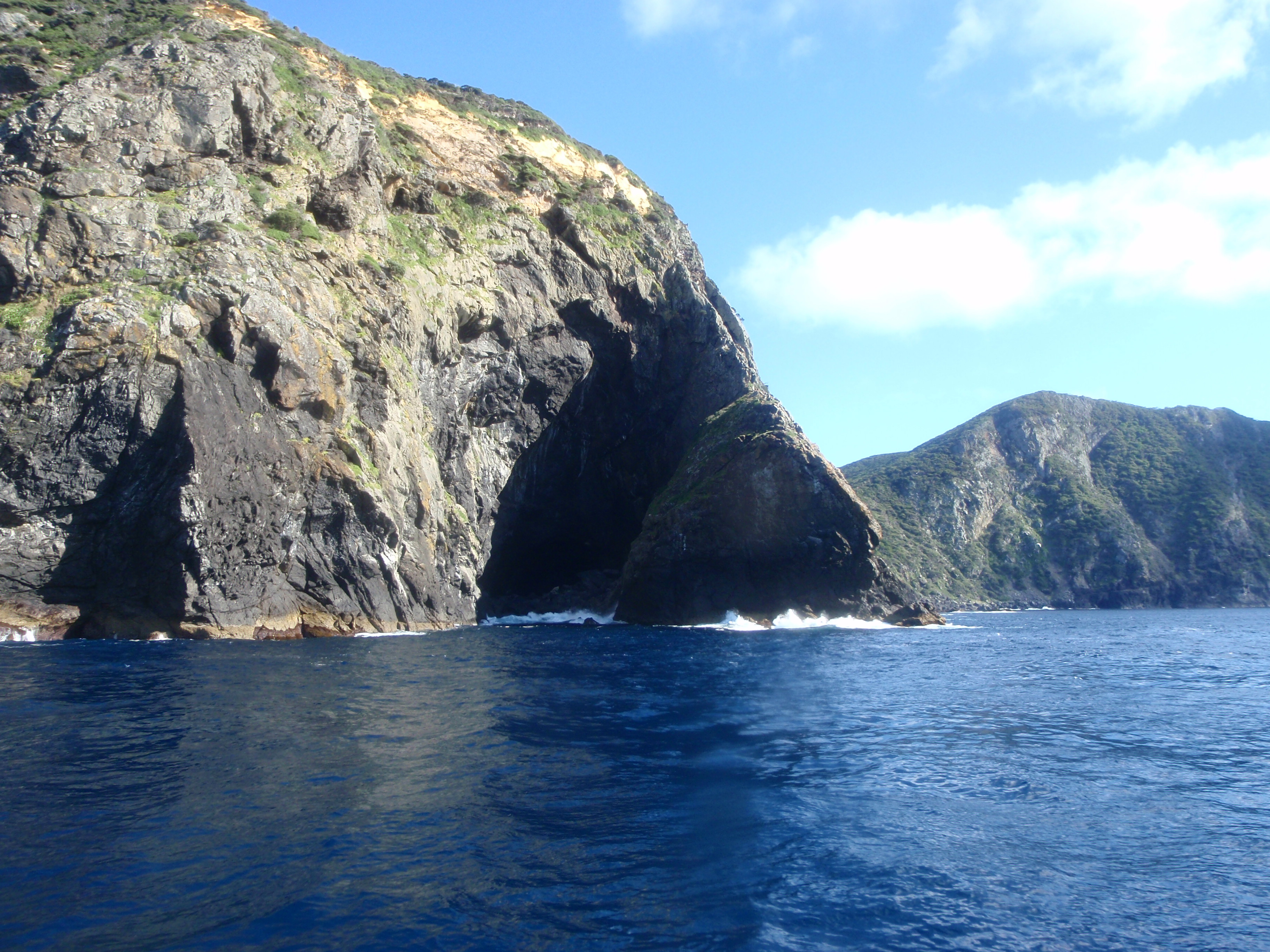
Manawatāwhi / Three Kings Islands; looking north with South East Bay to the right

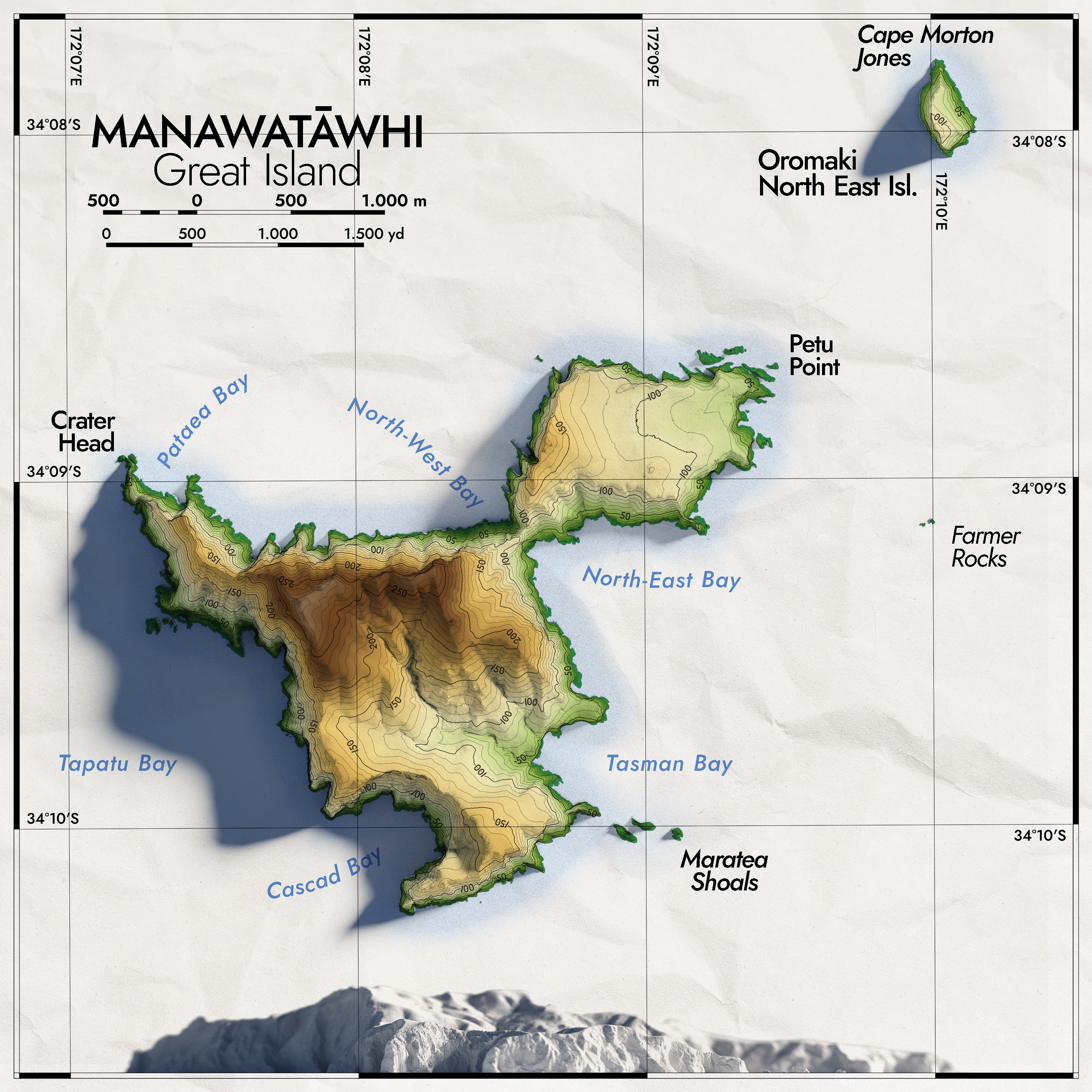
Great Island

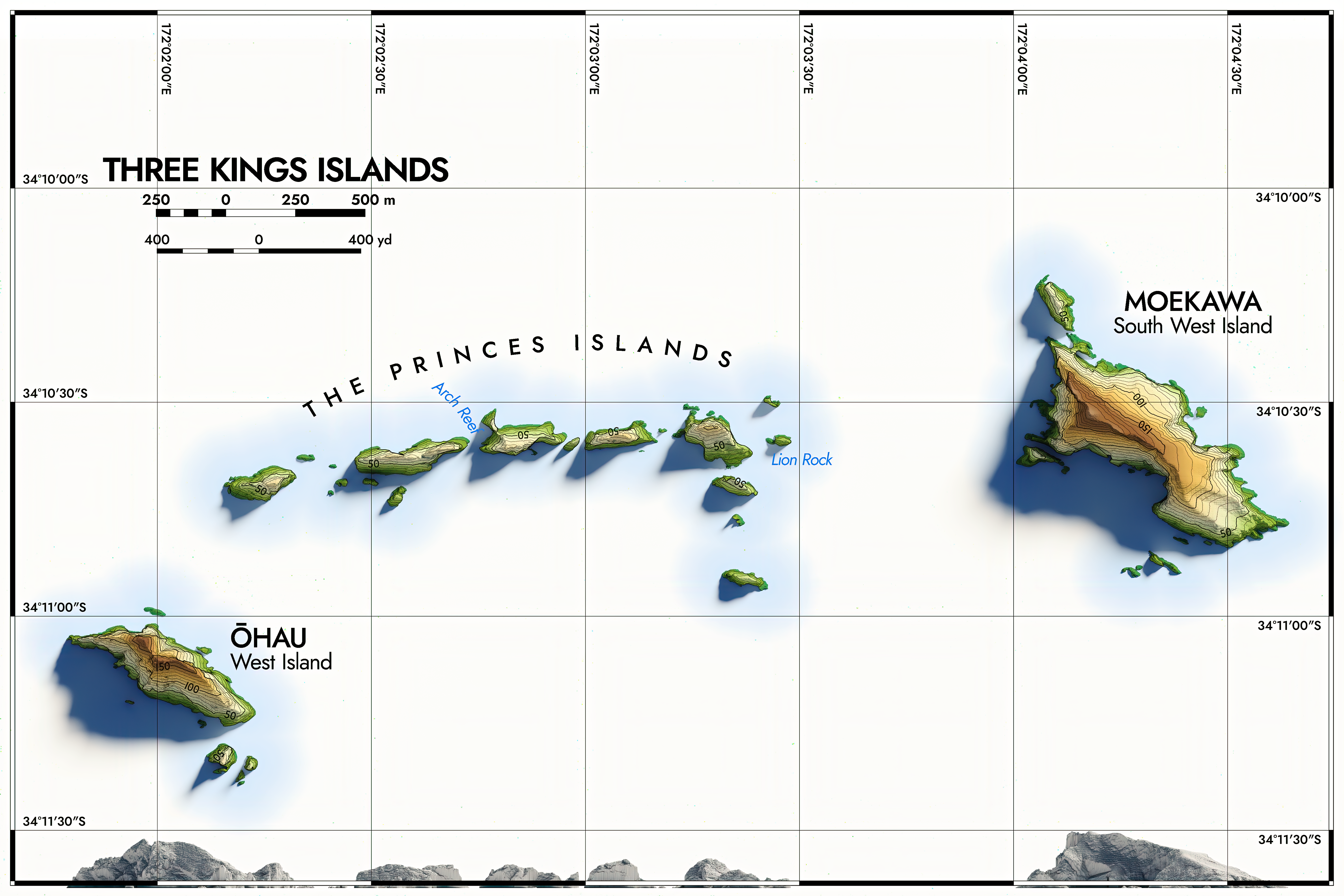
Western Islands

==== Oromaki / North East Island ====
A smaller island about 0.10 square kilometres (0.039 sq mi) in size and reaching a height of 111 metres (364 ft), approximately 1 kilometre (0.62 mi) northeast of Manawatāwhi. The island is surrounded by 70–90m high cliffs. Māori stonework and terracing can be found on the island.

==== Farmer Rocks ====
Farmer Rocks, 0.8 km east of Manawatāwhi / Great Island, are 5 metres high and just a few hundred square metres in size.

=== Southwest Group ===
==== Moekawa / South West Island ====
The second largest island of the group, at 0.38 square kilometres (0.15 sq mi) and a height of 207 metres (679 ft). It is about 4.5 km southwest of Great island. The island is surrounded by 80–120m high cliffs.

==== The Princes Islands ====
The Princes Islands are seven small islets and numerous rocks with a total area of about 0.2 km^{2}, start 600 m west of South West Island and stretch about 1.8 km east–west. The north-eastern islet is the highest at 106 m. The smallest islet is Rosemary Rock. These islands are sparsely vegetated.

==== Ōhau / West Island ====
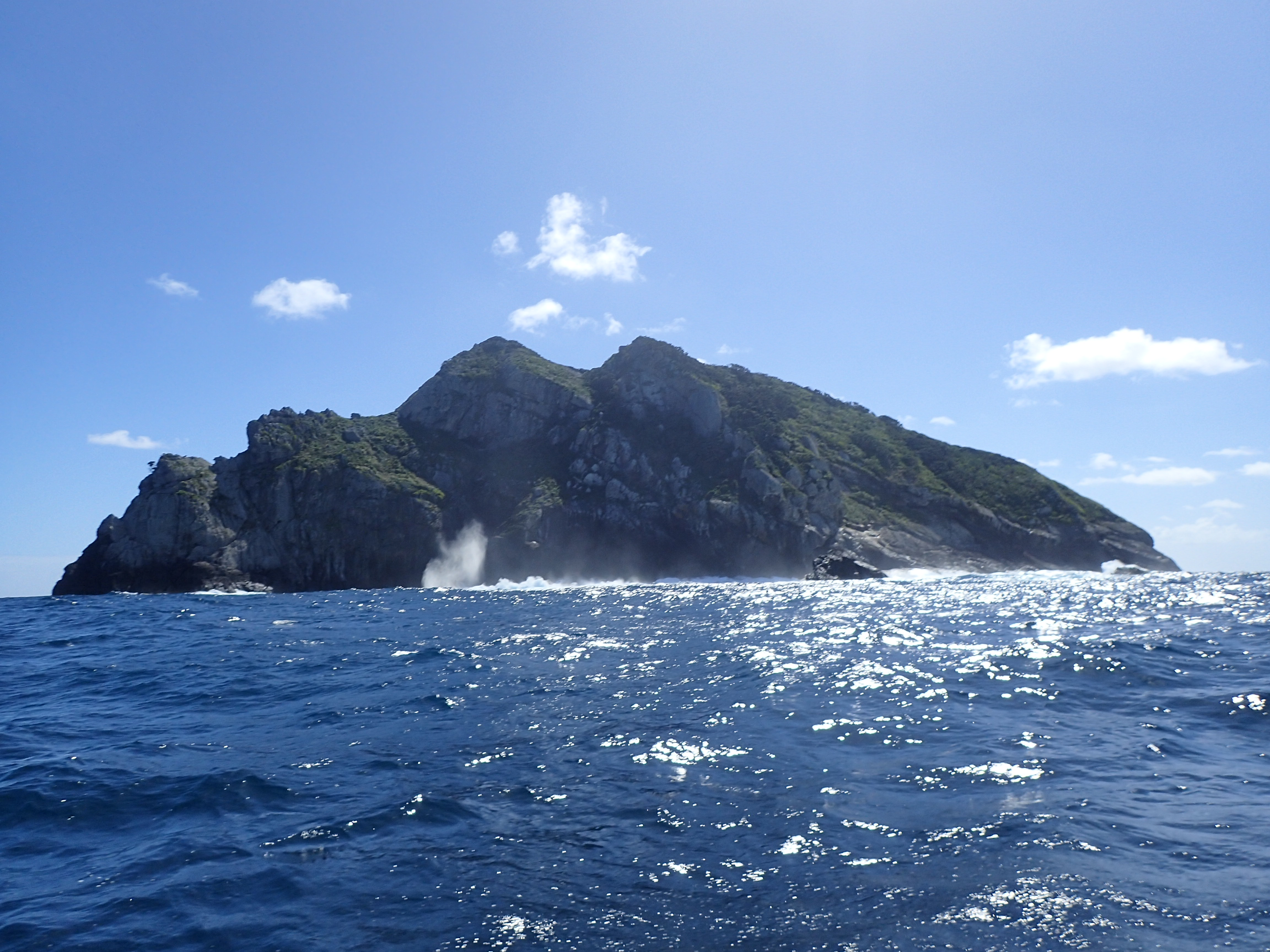
Ōhau viewed from the west

The third largest island at 0.16 km^{2}, found 500m southwest of the westernmost of the Princes Islands. It is 177m high, surrounded by 40–130m high cliffs. The island plays an important part in the traditional Māori belief that the spirits of dead Māori return to their Pacific homeland of Hawaiki. Near Cape Reinga on the mainland, sometimes translated as the underworld, is a gnarled Pōhutukawa tree reputed to be more than 800 years old. The spirits are believed to journey to the tree and down its roots into the sea bed. They are said to surface again on Ōhau and say a last farewell to New Zealand before going on to Hawaiki.

=== Geology ===
The islands have a volcanic origin.

== Flora and fauna ==
=== Flora ===
In 1945, G. T. S. Baylis made a remarkable discovery on the Three Kings Islands, when he found the last remaining specimen anywhere of a tree which is now called Pennantia baylisiana, a kaikomako. It was recognised internationally as the world's rarest and thus most endangered tree. Extremely careful propagation in New Zealand has resulted in the species being reliably established, but it continues to be carefully monitored. The islands were made a wildlife sanctuary in 1995. Other plants endemic to the islands include Tecomanthe speciosa and Elingamita johnsonii.

=== Fauna ===
The Three Kings have extremely high levels of endemism, even compared to other isolated islands. About 35% of its beetle species are found nowhere else, and there are six endemic genera: Gourlayia (Carabidae), Heterodoxa and Pseudopisalia (both Staphylinidae), Partystona and Zomedes (both Tenebrionidae) and Tribasileus (Anthribidae). There are probably another seven undescribed endemic genera. Falla's skink (Oligosoma fallai) is a reptile species only found on these islands. Many marine invertebrates found around the islands are also endemic, such as the molluscs Haliotis pirimoana (Manawatāwhi pāua) and Penion lineatus.

=== Geobiology ===
There is considerable evidence that the Three Kings Islands have not been recently connected to the North Island landmass but have been connected to each other by land bridges. Genetic studies of different insect populations have suggested different separation times from similar species found in the North Island varying from 24 million years ago to 2.24 million years ago. Further, some species of these islands that are within eyeshot of northern New Zealand have stronger genetic links to species now found in Australia or New Caledonia or no genetic links to present New Zealand species. These include the flax snail, Placostylus bollonsi Suter

=== Nature reserve ===
Three Kings Island is a nature reserve administered by the Department of Conservation. Rats and mice were never introduced to the Three Kings, although goats were introduced to Great Island and caused significant damage to the vegetation and soil.

== See also ==
- Desert island
- List of islands
