= Endemic flora of the Three Kings Islands =

Landing on the Three Kings Islands is difficult because of their high cliffs.

Of the 199 plant taxa found on the Three Kings Islands, an archipelago 55 km (34 mi) north-west of New Zealand, 177 are native to New Zealand and only a fraction (Note: Of the 13 vascular endemics originally claimed by Watson and Cranwell, only 12 are now recognised to be endemic. Add to this five non-vascular species and two new species from 2008 and 2014 to get 19.) are endemic (found nowhere else). The islands have likely been isolated from the mainland since the early Tertiary period and so the flora has been driven by allopatric speciation. Of note is that all of the vascular endemics are woody, other than the sedge Carex elingamita and the fern Davallia tasmanii subsp. tasmanii. In addition, the Three Kings Islands are regarded as a hotspot for seaweed endemism.

The islands: Great Island, South West Island, North East Island, West Island and the Princes Islands, cover a combined area of 6.85 km^{2} (2.64 sq mi). The geography is jagged and cliffed with the highest point being 280 m (920 ft). A warm current flows around them, creating a high humidity, misty environment. Before their eradication in 1946, goats depleted the flora to such an extent that two species—Pennantia baylisiana and Tecomanthe speciosa—were reduced to a single plant each. As a result, the New Zealand Threat Classification System lists these species as Nationally Critical. Other endemics are given the status Naturally Uncommon or Nationally Vulnerable because of their small geographic range, and their relatively slow recovery.

== Vascular plants ==
Endemic vascular plants of the Three Kings Islands
Scientific name	Image	Common name(s)	Family	NZTCS	Distribution	Ref.
Alectryon excelsus subsp. grandis (Cheeseman) de Lange et E.K.Cameron, 1999	Medium sized tree with shiny leaves	Three Kings tītoki	Sapindaceae	Nationally Vulnerable	Great and West Islands	
Brachyglottis arborescens W.R.B.Oliv., 1948	Clusters of large glossy green leaves	Three Kings rangiora	Asteraceae	Nationally Vulnerable	Great and West Islands	
Carex elingamita Hamlin, 1958	Tubular green spiked fruit of a sedge	Three Kings sedge	Cyperaceae	Naturally Uncommon	Three Kings Islands	
Coprosma macrocarpa subsp. macrocarpa Cheeseman,	Bunches of unfurling white flowers and large green leaves	Large-seeded coprosma	Rubiaceae	Naturally Uncommon	Three Kings Islands	
Davallia tasmanii subsp. tasmanii Field,	Small fern with bright green leaves	Davallia, Three Kings davallia	Davalliaceae	Naturally Uncommon	Three Kings Islands	
Elingamita johnsonii G.T.S.Baylis, 1951	Medium-sized tree with dark leaves and bright red berries	Elingamita	Primulaceae	Naturally Uncommon	West Island	
Kunzea triregensis de Lange, 2014	Small tree with tiny leaves	Three Kings kānuka	Myrtaceae	Naturally Uncommon	Three Kings Islands	
Myrsine oliveri Allan, 1961	Bright green leaves of medium-sized tree		Primulaceae	Naturally Uncommon	South West, West and Great Islands	
Paratrophis smithii Cheeseman, 1888	Dark glossy foliage of medium-sized tree	Three Kings milk tree	Moraceae	Naturally Uncommon	Three Kings Islands	
Pittosporum fairchildii Cheeseman, 1887	Foliage of plant with rain droplets on the leaves	Fairchild’s kōhūhū	Pittosporaceae	Naturally Uncommon	North East, South West, West and Great Islands	
Pennantia baylisiana G.T.S.Baylis, 1977	Medium-sized tree with large dark and glossy leaves	Kaikōmako manawa tāwhi, Three Kings kaikōmako	Pennantiaceae	Nationally Critical	Great Island	
Pimelea telura C.J.Burrows, 2008	Small plant that has been dried and pressed	Three Kings pimelea	Thymelaeaceae	Naturally Uncommon	Great Island	
Tecomanthe speciosa W.R.B.Oliv., 1948	Large cluster of unfurling white bell-shaped flowers	Tecomanthe, Akapukaea	Bignoniaceae	Nationally Critical	Great Island	
Veronica insularis Cheeseman, 1897	Small shrub with pink and white flowers	Three Kings koromiko	Plantaginaceae	Naturally Uncommon	North East, South West, West and Great Islands	

== Non-vascular plants ==
Endemic non-vascular flora of the Three Kings Islands
Scientific name	Image	Common name(s)	Family	NZTCS	Distribution	Ref.
Sargassum johnsonii Chapman, 1961	Seaweed that has been dried and pressed	Totara weed	Sargassaceae	Not Threatened	Intertidal and subtidal zones of the Three Kings Islands	
Chlidophyllon kaspar (W.A.Nelson et N.M.Adams) W.A.Nelson,	Seaweed that has been dried and pressed		Erythrotrichiaceae	Not Threatened	Three Kings Islands	
Curdiea balthazar W.A.Nelson, G.A.Knight et R.Falshaw, 1999	Red seaweed that has been dried and pressed		Gracilariceae	Not Threatened	Three Kings Islands	
Adamsiella melchiori L.E.Phillips & W.A.Nelson, 2002	Red seaweed that has been dried and pressed		Rhodomelaceae	Not Threatened	Three Kings Islands	
Skeletonella nelsoniae Millar & De Clerck, 2007	Sea weed specimen		Ceramiaceae	Not Threatened	Three Kings Islands	
