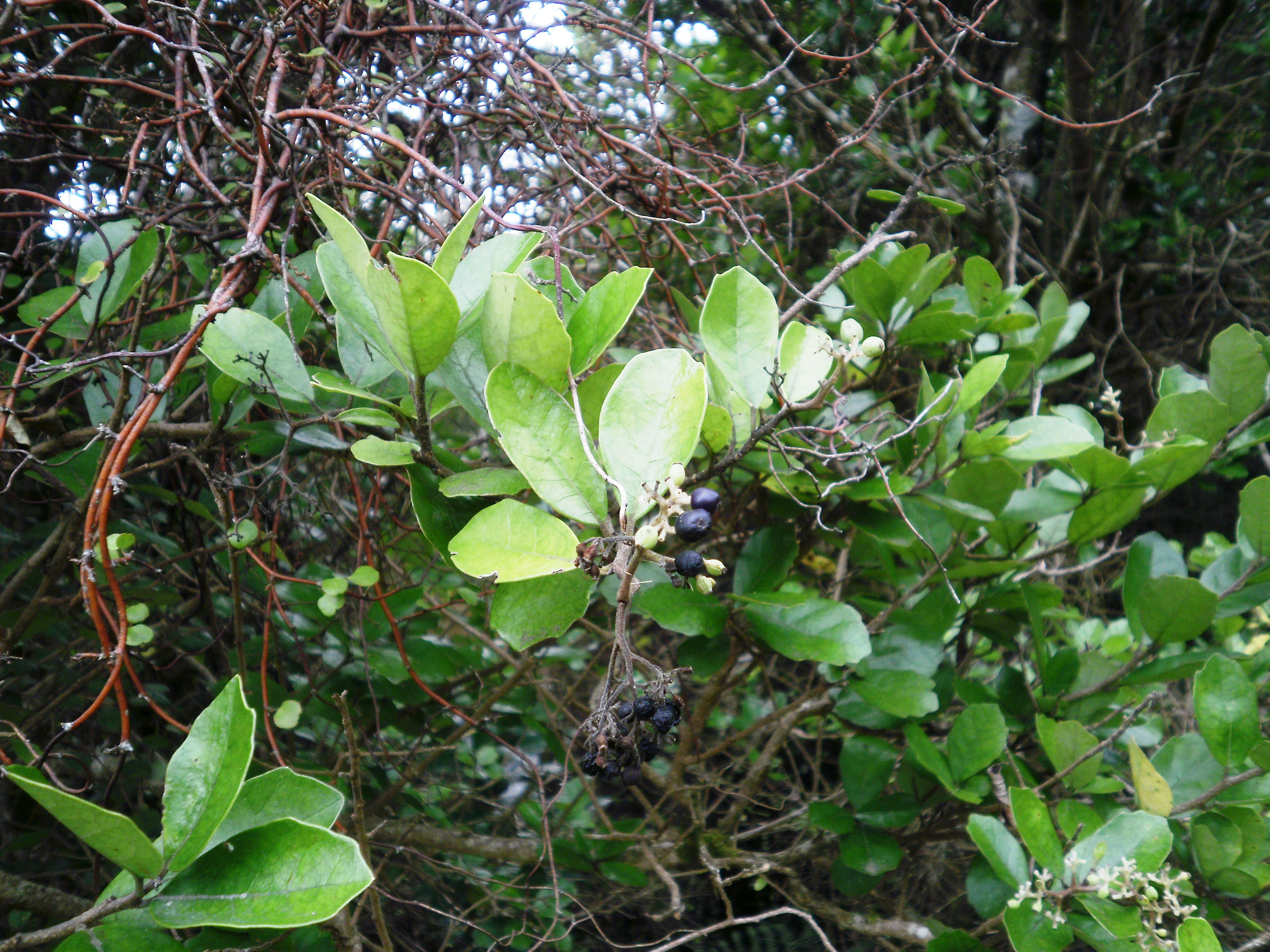

Scientific classification
- Kingdom: Plantae
- Clade: Embryophytes
- Clade: Tracheophytes
- Clade: Spermatophytes
- Clade: Angiosperms
- Clade: Eudicots
- Clade: Asterids
- Order: Apiales
- Family: Pennantiaceae
- Genus: Pennantia
- Species: P. corymbosa

Binomial name
- Pennantia corymbosa J.R.Forst. & G.Forst.

= Pennantia corymbosa =

Species of tree endemic to New Zealand

Pennantia corymbosa, commonly known as kaikomako (from the Māori kaikōmako), is a small dioecious tree endemic to New Zealand.

Small, creamy flowers are produced between November and February, followed by a shiny black fruit in autumn. They are a favourite food of the New Zealand bellbird.

The Māori name kaikōmako means food (kai) of the bellbird (kōmako). Traditionally, Māori used the tree to make fire by repeatedly rubbing a pointed stick into a groove on a piece of māhoe.

An English name is "duck's foot", coming from the shape of the juvenile plant's leaf. Juvenile plants have small leaves with tangled, divaricating stems, while mature plants have much larger leaves and a normal tree architecture.

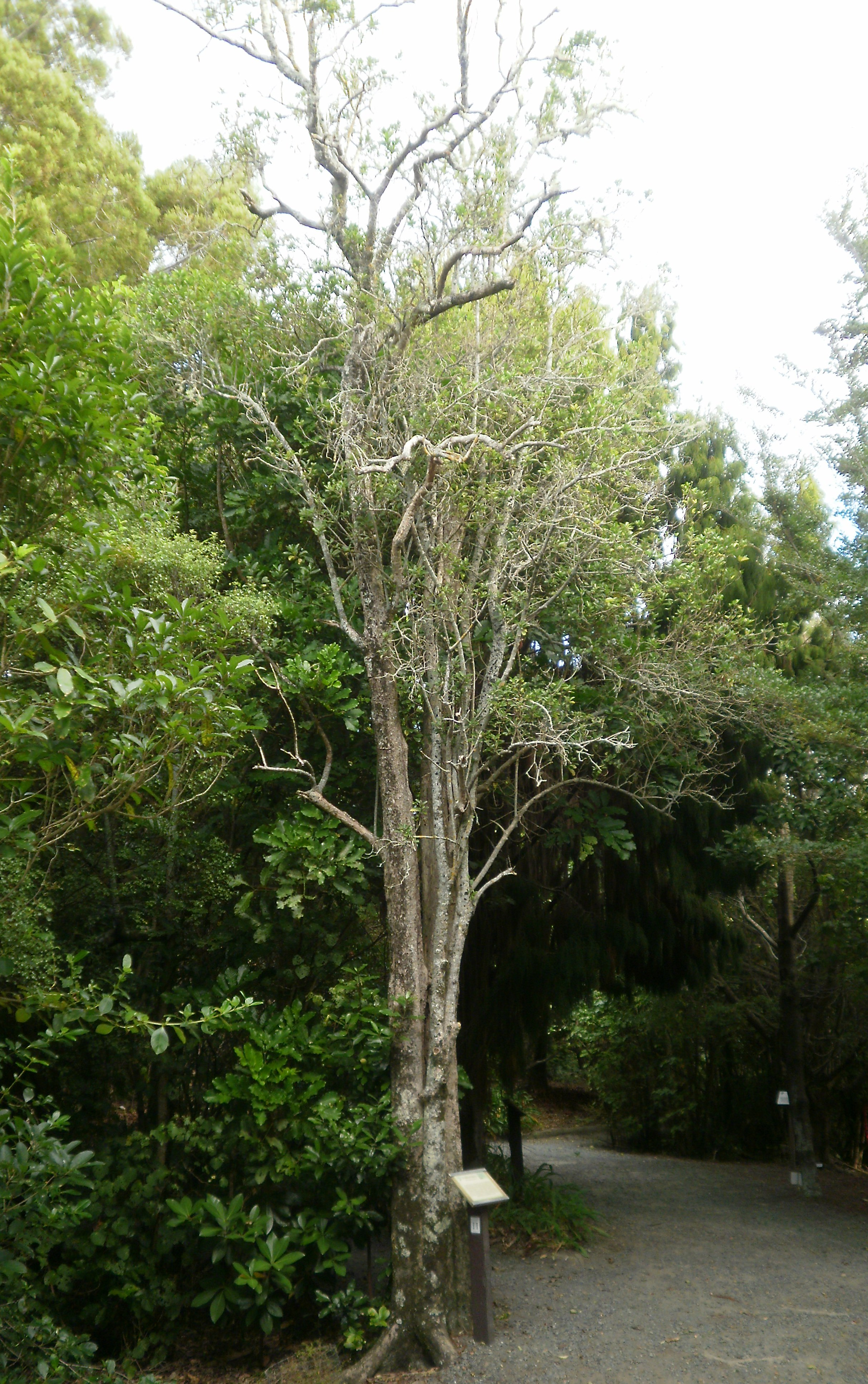
A kaikomako tree

== Description ==
Identifying P. corymbosa is different at each stage of its life. As a seedling, Kaikōmako has cotyledons which are entire and oval shaped, and are about 10 by 8 millimetres (0.39 by 0.31 in) in size. As the plant grows, the first true leaves are about 9 x 8mm and are three-toothed. As a juvenile, the plant grows into a dense shrub with branches that zig-zag and tangle. As a juvenile, it has small leaves that are about 7 to 15 millimetres (0.28 to 0.59 in) long. Kaikōmako leaves in juvenile form make it easy to identify as they look like duck feet, which is why Kaikōmako is also known as duck's foot. When Kaikōmako grows to adult size, which can be up to 10 meters high, and the plant grows into more of a tree form rather than a shrub, with one predominant branch growing into a single trunk. At its adult stage, Kaikōmako grows leaves that are about 5 cm long. Kaikōmako leaves are evergreen. When Kaikōmako is flowering, it has cream flowers that can completely cover the plant, and then small black/purple berries a few months later.

== Range ==
=== Natural global range ===
Pennantia corymbosa is endemic to New Zealand, although other species that are in the Pennantiaceae family are found elsewhere, such as Pennantia cunninghamii which is found in Australia.

=== New Zealand range ===
Kaikōmako is found in the North Island, South Island and Stewart Island, and in some islands near New Zealand. Kaikōmako is less common in the northern part of New Zealand as it prefers colder temperatures, so it is more common further south where it is colder. Kaikōmako was also thought to be present on Great Barrier Island but Gardner disproved this, finding that the specimens that were found there were specimens of Melicytus micranthus and not Pennantia corymbosa.

== Habitat ==
Kaikōmako is found in lowland forests and coastal areas as it prefers milder temperatures. The location of Kaikōmako can affect the growth of the tree. Beddie found the trees that were less than half a kilometre from the sea, which were exposed to a strong sea breeze, were mostly short and stunted and had leaves that were smaller than usual. Beddie also noted that they had almost no adult growth at all, and that there were no fruits found lower than 1.5 metres (4.9 feet) off the ground.

== Ecology ==
=== Life cycle and phenology ===
Kaikōmako has three stages; juvenile, intermediate and adult. Kaikomako can fruit in its intermediate stage and even in its juvenile stage; this is known as precocious fruiting. Kaikōmako is described as a divaricate juvenile (spread out) which has heteroblastic development. Heteroblastic development occurs when the plant undergoes an abrupt change which can be in its form and its function. In Kaikōmako, this heteroblastic development happens from its intermediate stage to its adult stage at about 2 metres (6.6 ft), when the leaves change colour, shape and size becoming its adult form. One stem will eventually take over, rising upward and producing the larger adult leaves. Once Kaikōmako grows past 2 m and enters its adult stage Kaikōmako can grow to be up to 10 metres (33 ft) tall. Many of the Kaikōmako trees that are in their adult stage will still feature lower-level juvenile leaves whilst having upper-level adult leaves. Kaikōmako is said to have this juvenile divaricate phase because it may enhance the plant's chance at capturing light, which would be advantageous to the plant as it grows in forests which can be covered by the canopy of larger trees. Kaikōmako flowers from November to February and fruits from January to May. The fruits of the Kaikōmako tree are usually black but Beddie wrote that the fruits are certainly purple when ripe in the Wellington region. Kaikōmako is dioecious, meaning it has female and male flowers. The female flower's anthers are shorter than the males, and the male flowers have a rudimentary ovary that doesn't have a stigma. Kaikōmako can fruit at any stage of its development. Beddie shows photos of Kaikōmako twigs which have adult, intermediate and juvenile foliage, yet they're all fruiting. Beddie discussed how a seed from a juvenile fruit was germinated, and grew into a seedling but didn't produce fruit. Beddie also mentioned that because of Kaikōmako's precocious fruiting, as it had confused a lot of early experienced botanists.

The genus Pennantia contains only four species. Maurin studied the phylogeny of the genus Pennantia and found that Pennantia cunninghamii, which is found in Australia, is the sister to the rest of the genus. Maurin also found that the species Pennantia baylisiana, which is from the Three Kings Islands and is known as Three Kings Island Kaikōmako, was sister to a clade formed by P. corymbosa and the species Pennantia endlicheri, which is found on Norfolk Island.

=== Predators, parasites, and diseases ===
The name Kaikōmako translates to food (kai) for the bellbird (kōmako). As the name suggests, Kaikōmako fruit is often eaten by bellbirds. As the Kaikōmako plant fruits from January to May, the bellbird eats the fruit of the plant during these times. Honey bees have been observed to nest above the ground and have been found to nest in large holes in Kaikōmako trees. Honey bees also feed on and collect the nectar of the Kaikōmako tree when it is flowering (November to February). The fruit of Kaikōmako can be eaten by possums and other introduced mammals. Thrips feed on old leaves of shrubs and trees, including the Kaikōmako tree. The adult and larva thrips both do this. This can cause leaf silvering and speckling on Kaikōmako.

== Cultural uses ==
Kaikōmako was used traditionally by Māori to generate fire. Māori made fire by friction and used Kaikomako as te hika (rubbing stick). Kaikōmako was used as it is a hard and durable wood and was rubbed with obsidian or a shell to make the stick sharp and then was used with Mahoe (another native New Zealand tree) by rubbing the Kaikōmako stick into the grooves of the Mahoe to make fire. Kaikōmako was used as te hika because in Māori mythology a Māori goddess of fire named Mahuika left her magic flame preserved in a Kaikōmako stick for the use of man-kind to make fire.
