= Brown beech =

Brown beech is a common name for several plants and may refer to:

- Cryptocarya glaucescens
- Pennantia cunninghamii

Brown beech is also a common name for a mushroom native to East Asia:

- Hypsizygus tessulatus
