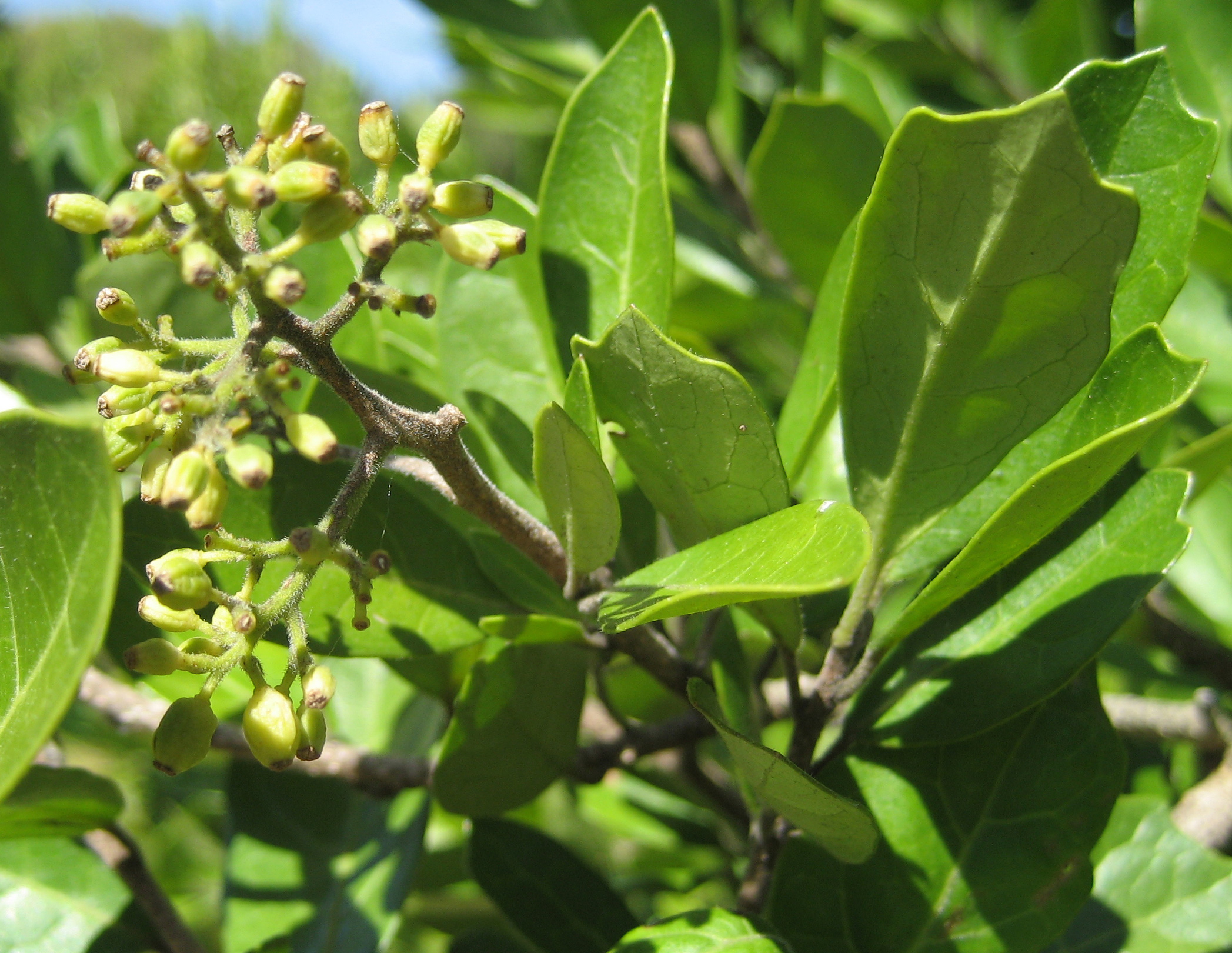
- Pennantia corymbosa

Scientific classification
- Kingdom: Plantae
- Clade: Embryophytes
- Clade: Tracheophytes
- Clade: Spermatophytes
- Clade: Angiosperms
- Clade: Eudicots
- Clade: Asterids
- Order: Apiales
- Family: Pennantiaceae; J.Agardh
- Genus: Pennantia; J.R.Forst. & G.Forst.

Type species
- Pennantia corymbosa J.R.Forst. & G.Forst.

Synonyms
- Plectomirtha W.R.B.Oliv.

= Pennantia =

Genus of flowering plants

Pennantia is the sole genus in the plant family Pennantiaceae. In older classifications, it was placed in the family Icacinaceae. Most authorities have recognised three or four species, depending on whether they recognised Pennantia baylisiana as a separate species from Pennantia endlicheri. Botanist David Mabberley has recognised two species.

The species are small to medium, sometimes multi-trunked trees. Leaves are alternate, leathery, and with entire or sometimes toothed margins. Inflorescences are terminal and flowers are functionally unisexual; the species are more or less dioecious.

Pennantia species grow naturally in New Zealand, Norfolk Island, and eastern Australia. In Australia, P. cunninghamii grows across a broad latitudinal natural range (nearly 3,000 km (1,900 mi)), from the south coast of New South Wales northwards through to north eastern Queensland.

The genus name, Pennantia, is in honor of Thomas Pennant, an 18th-century Welsh zoologist and author.

== Species ==
The following four species were recognised by New Zealand botanists Rhys O. Gardner and Peter J. de Lange in 2002.

- Pennantia baylisiana, (W.R.B.Oliv.) G.T.S.Baylis – Three Kings Islands
- Pennantia corymbosa J.R.Forst. & G.Forst., 'kaikōmako' – New Zealand
- Pennantia cunninghamii Miers, 'brown beech' – NSW, Qld, Australia
- Pennantia endlicheri Reissek – Norfolk Island
