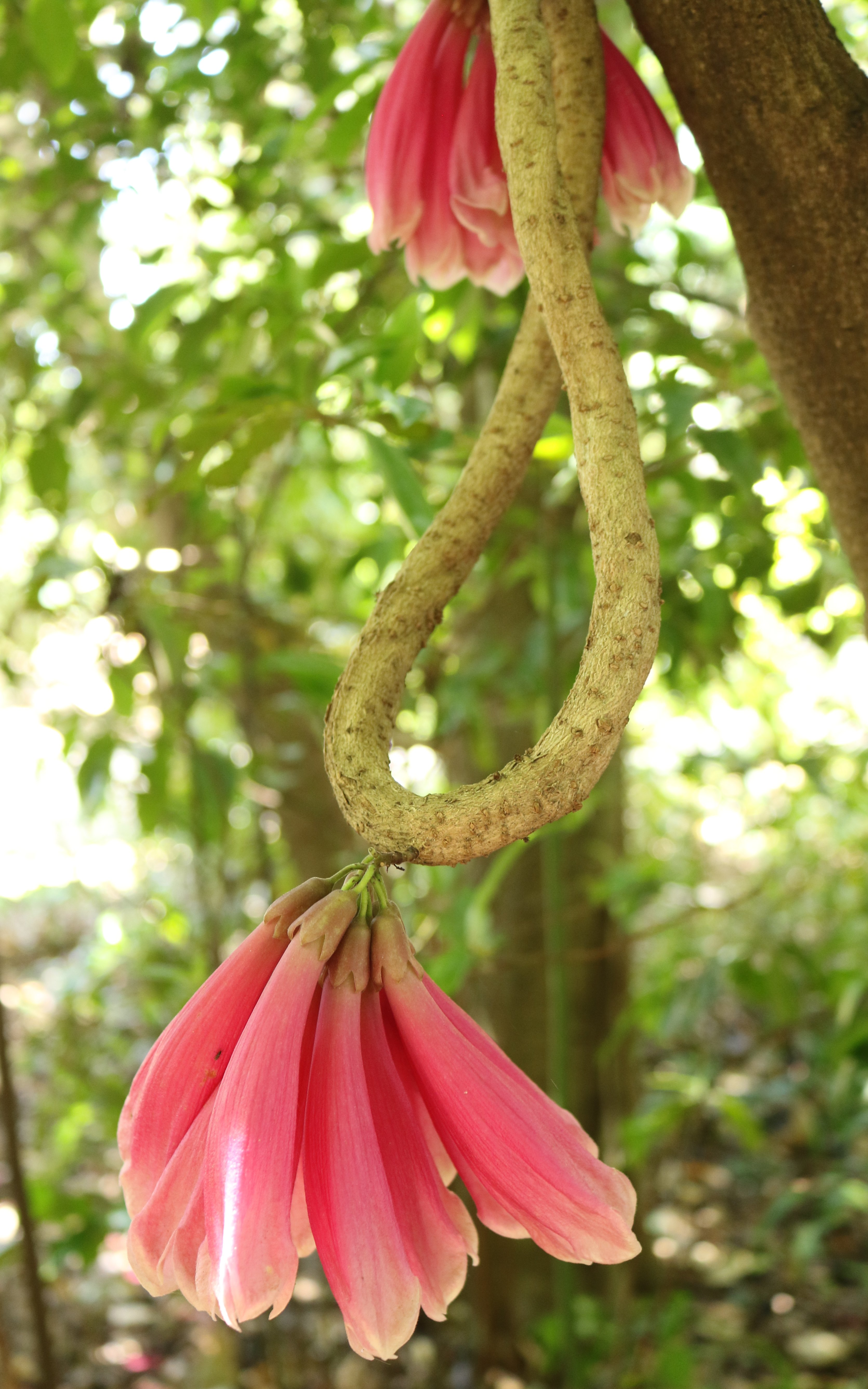

Scientific classification
- Kingdom: Plantae
- Clade: Tracheophytes
- Clade: Angiosperms
- Clade: Eudicots
- Clade: Asterids
- Order: Lamiales
- Family: Bignoniaceae
- Genus: Tecomanthe
- Species: T. dendrophila

Binomial name
- Tecomanthe dendrophila (Blume) K. Schum.

= Tecomanthe dendrophila =

Species of vine

Tecomanthe dendrophila, commonly known as New Guinea trumpet vine, is a climber native to New Guinea, the Solomon Islands and the Maluku Islands. It is a large woody vine growing to 20 metres long, with pinnate foliage and large colourful flowers.
