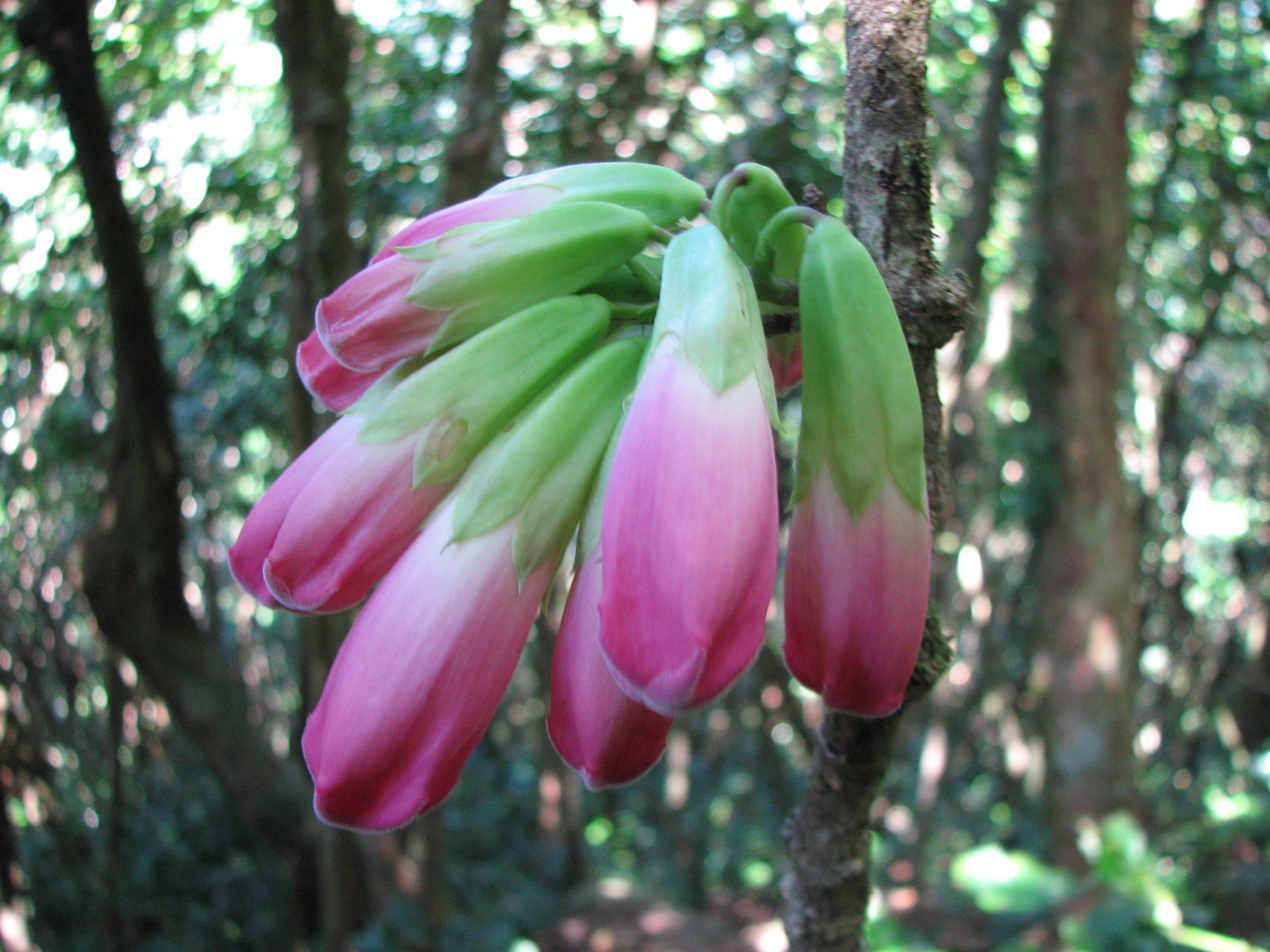
- Flowers of a plant near Cape Tribulation

Scientific classification
- Kingdom: Plantae
- Clade: Tracheophytes
- Clade: Angiosperms
- Clade: Eudicots
- Clade: Asterids
- Order: Lamiales
- Family: Bignoniaceae
- Genus: Tecomanthe
- Species: T. burungu

Binomial name
- Tecomanthe burungu Zich & A.J.Ford

= Tecomanthe burungu =

Species of vine

Tecomanthe burungu, commonly known as Roaring Meg Creek trumpet vine or the pink trumpet vine, is a climber native to Queensland, Australia. The taxon was recorded in the Australian Plant Census in 2010 as Tecomanthe sp. Roaring Meg and formally described in 2018. It is cultivated for their ornamental pink tubular flowers.
