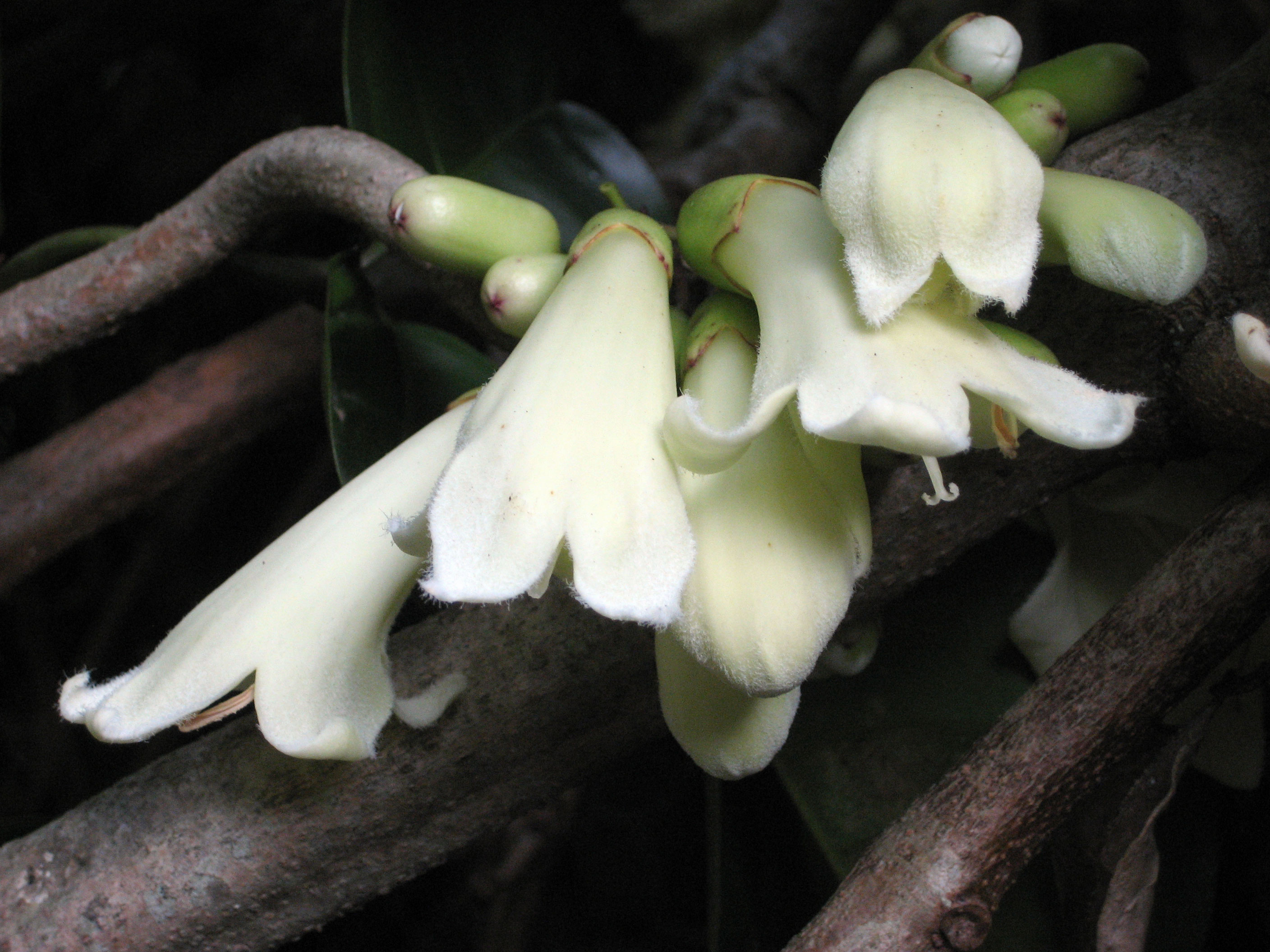
- Tecomanthe speciosa

Scientific classification
- Kingdom: Plantae
- Clade: Tracheophytes
- Clade: Angiosperms
- Clade: Eudicots
- Clade: Asterids
- Order: Lamiales
- Family: Bignoniaceae
- Tribe: Tecomeae
- Genus: Tecomanthe; Baill.

Species
- See text

= Tecomanthe =

Genus of flowering plants

Tecomanthe is a genus of 5 species of tropical or subtropical forest lianes in the family Bignoniaceae. They have attractive trumpet-like flowers and glossy leaves. They are native to Australia, Indonesia, New Guinea, New Zealand, and the Solomon Islands.

== Species ==
Image	Name	Description	Distribution
	Tecomanthe burungu (Roaring Meg Creek trumpet vine or pink trumpet vine)	a newly described species in 2018	Queensland.
	Tecomanthe dendrophila (or T. venusta)	The 11 cm flowers are pink and creamy-yellow, ageing to a uniform magenta-pink.	grows in the Moluccas, throughout New Guinea, and east into New Britain and the Solomon Islands.
	Tecomanthe hillii	pink flowers	eastern Queensland.
	Tecomanthe speciosa	Extremely rare, being only one plant exists in the wild, T. speciosa is now in cultivation, and is a rampant woody vine with cream flowers. It will grow in warm temperate climates, but is very sensitive to frost.	endemic to the Three Kings Islands off northern New Zealand
	Tecomanthe ternatensis	White flowers that turn pink as they age.	Its natural range is from the Moluccas east to northwest New Guinea.
	Tecomanthe volubilis	It grows in mossy forests at elevation, and will grow in warm temperate conditions. It has rose-pink flowers.	endemic to New Guinea
