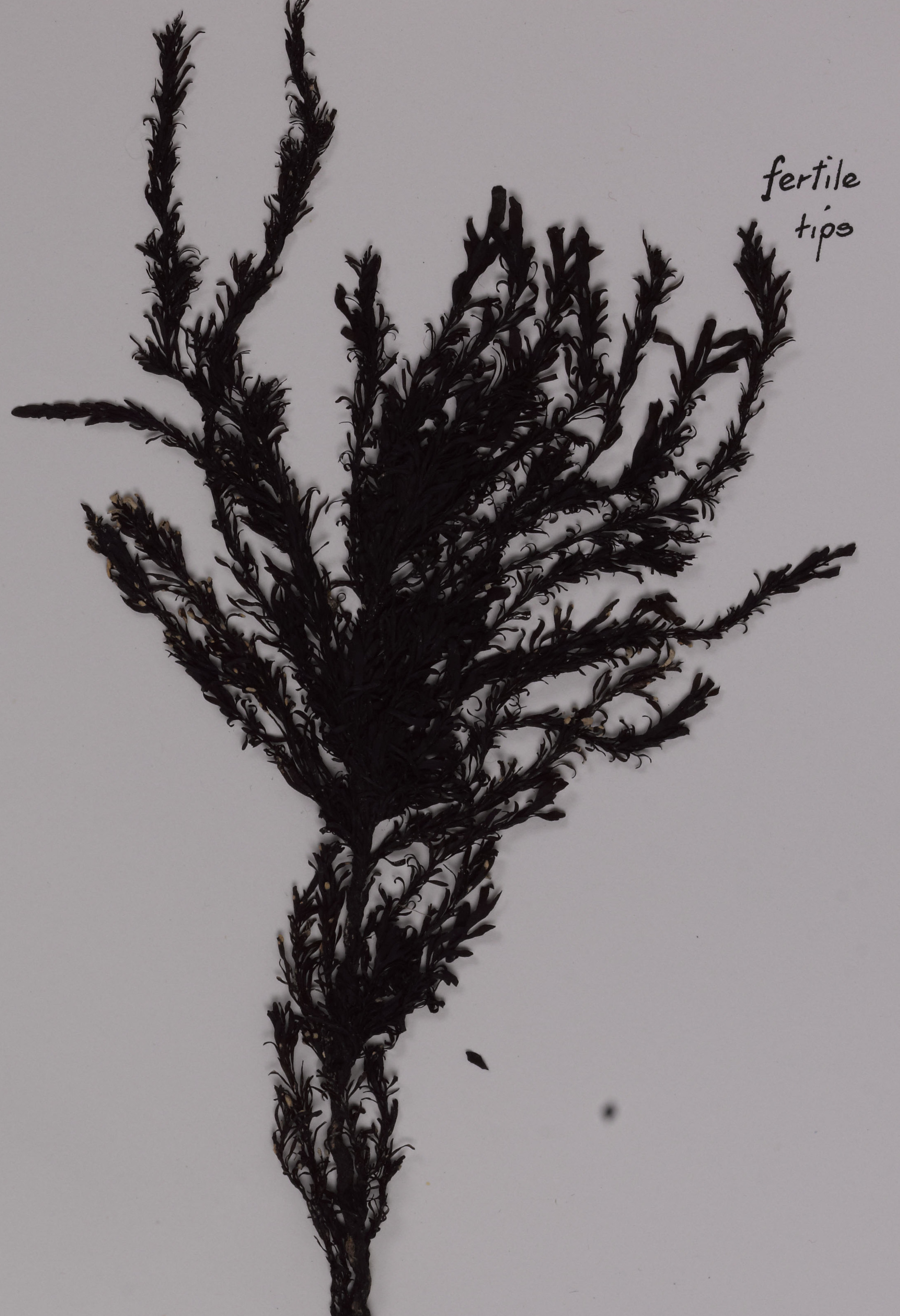

Scientific classification
- Domain: Eukaryota
- Clade: Sar
- Clade: Stramenopiles
- Phylum: Ochrophyta
- Class: Phaeophyceae
- Order: Fucales
- Family: Sargassaceae
- Genus: Sargassum
- Species: S. johnsonii

Binomial name
- Sargassum johnsonii Chapman, 1961

= Sargassum johnsonii =

Species of brown seaweed

Sargassum johnsonii is a brown seaweed of the genus Sargassum that is endemic to the Three Kings Islands in New Zealand. It is sometimes called totara weed because of the resemblance to the foliage of the New Zealand native tree totara. Its scientific name derives from its discoverer, Magnus Earle Johnson, Three Kings Islands explorer and captain of the yacht Rosemary, who landed botanists on the islands on several occasions.

Sargassum johnsonii grows in rocky intertidal habitats, often extending to the subtidal zone up to a depth of 40 m (130 ft). It is a foundation species, and being very abundant around Three Kings Islands it creates numerous microhabitats for other forms of marine life such as bryozoans, sea squirts, and sponges.

== Morphology ==
Plants are usually large, with a height of 50–60 cm (20–24 in). The main stem is bare and knobby. Basal leaves have strap-shaped form, simple or lobed with an indistinct midrib. Upper leaves are small, narrow and with an indistinct midrib. Holdfast is a small truncate disc. The thallus is dark brown, with a tough, leathery texture. It has no air-vesicles, and its receptacles are small, swollen, and around 2 mm long, clustered in the axils of the upper leaves.

== Sources ==
- Adams, N.M. (1994). Seaweeds of New Zealand: An Illustrated Guide. Canterbury University Press. ISBN 978-0908812219.
