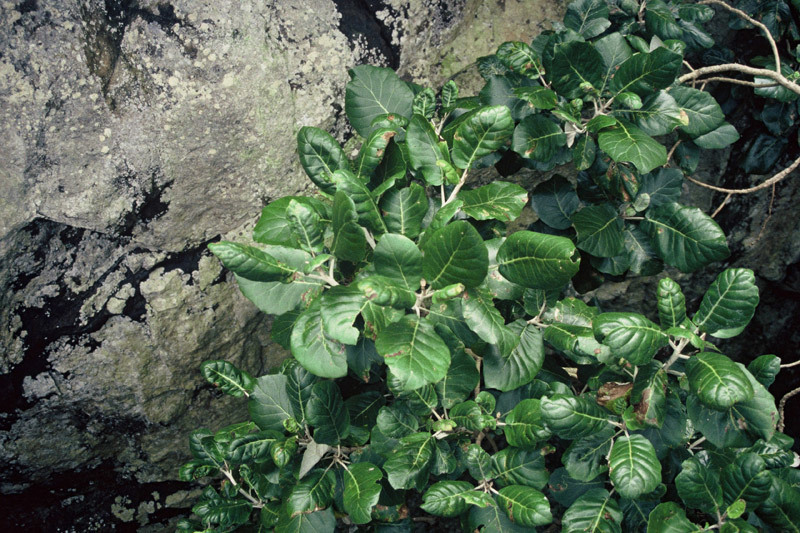

Conservation status
- Endangered (IUCN 2.3)

- Naturally Uncommon (NZ TCS)

Scientific classification
- Kingdom: Plantae
- Clade: Tracheophytes
- Clade: Angiosperms
- Clade: Eudicots
- Clade: Asterids
- Order: Asterales
- Family: Asteraceae
- Genus: Brachyglottis
- Species: B. arborescens

Binomial name
- Brachyglottis arborescens W.R.B. Oliver

= Brachyglottis arborescens =

Species of flowering plant

Brachyglottis arborescens, the Three Kings rangiora, is a species of flowering plant in the family Asteraceae. It is endemic to New Zealand, where it is known only from Manawatāwhi Three Kings Islands.

== Description ==
A small tree reaching 3 to 6 m in height with a trunk that can be up to 30 centimetres or more in diameter at the base and with thick, cork-like bark. Leaves are very glossy, obovate in shape, and with slightly lobed or sinuous edges.

== Distribution ==
The species is endemic to Manawatāwhi Three Kings Islands. Plants of B. arborescens were rare on Great Island, restricted to relict groves, until 1946 when goats were eradicated from the island, when their numbers increased markedly.

== Taxonomy ==
Brachyglottis arborescens was originally described by New Zealand naturalist Walter Oliver in 1948. The type specimen was collected by New Zealand botanist Geoff Baylis in 1945 and the holotype is housed at Auckland War Memoria Museum Herbarium. The species epithet arborescens refers to its tree-like habit.

In the original description, Oliver suggested this species could be distinguished from Brachyglottis repanda and B. rangiora by its arborescent habit, thick trunk and bark, less lobed leaves, shorter panicles and longer involucral bracts.

B. repanda was shown to be the sister species of B. arborescens in two phylogenetic studies using the standard nuclear ribosomal DNA internal transcribe spacer (ITS) region.

== Conservation status ==
B. arborescens is considered to be At Risk - Naturally Uncommon with the qualifiers CD ("conservation dependent") and IE ("island endemic") in the latest New Zealand threat status assessment.
