= Pennantia endlicheri =

Conservation status
- Endangered (EPBC Act)

Scientific classification
- Kingdom: Plantae
- Clade: Embryophytes
- Clade: Tracheophytes
- Clade: Spermatophytes
- Clade: Angiosperms
- Clade: Eudicots
- Clade: Asterids
- Order: Apiales
- Family: Pennantiaceae
- Genus: Pennantia
- Species: P. endlicheri

Binomial name
- Pennantia endlicheri Reissek, 1842

Species of flowering plant in the coffee family

Pennantia endlicheri, also known as Norfolk Island brown beech, is a flowering plant in the Pennantiaceae family. It is endemic to the Australian external territory of Norfolk Island in the south-west Pacific Ocean. It was originally described in 1842 by Austrian botanist Siegfried Reissek.

== Description ==
The species grows as a large shrub or a tree up to 10 m in height. It has small white flowers which are functionally dioecious.

== Distribution and habitat ==
The trees occur in sheltered moist palm valley forest, moist upland hardwood forest and pine-hardwood ridge forest, mainly in the Norfolk Island National Park. Threats include competition with invasive weeds and seed predation by rodents. The species' conservation status has been assessed as Endangered.
