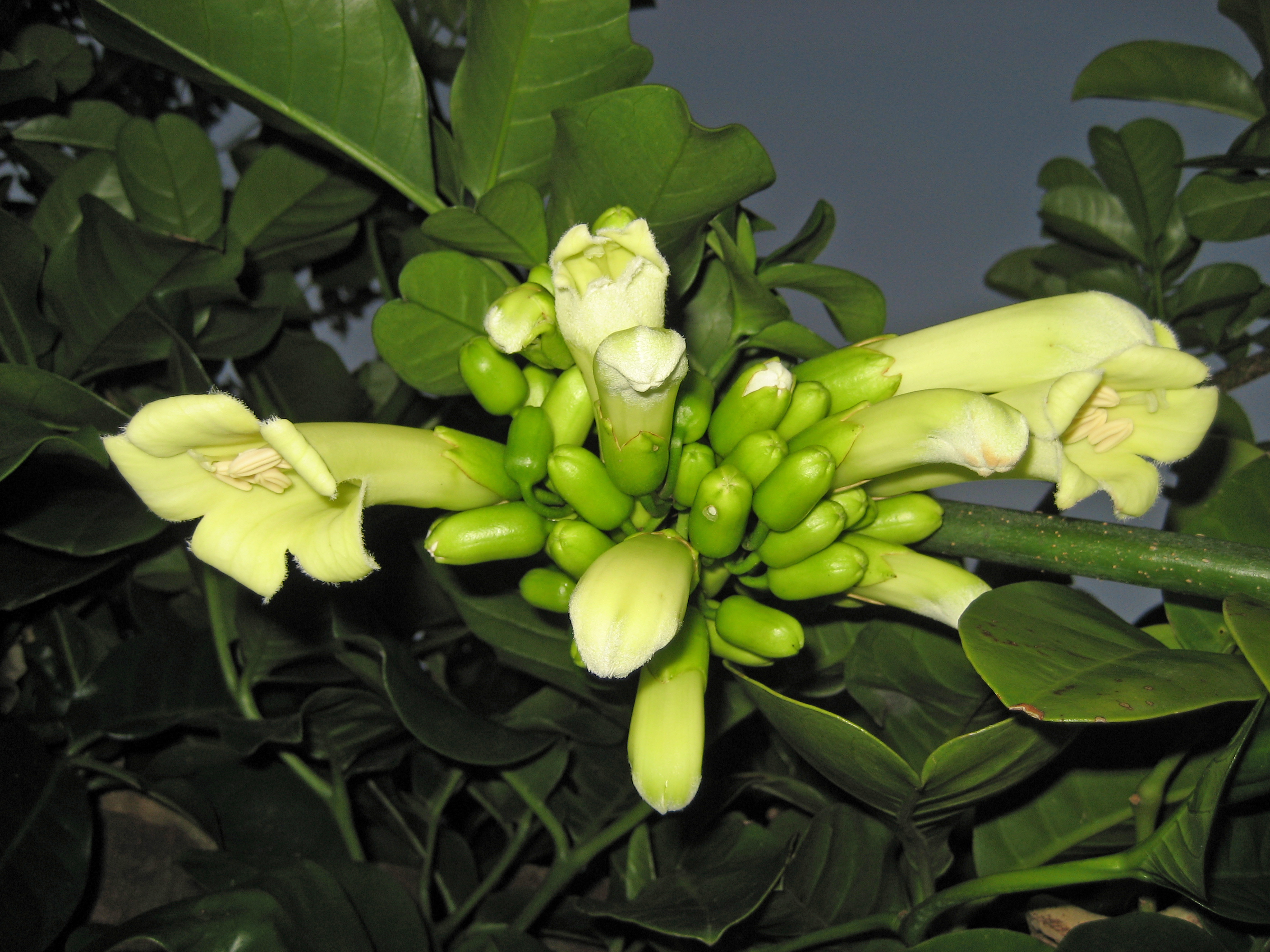

Conservation status
- Nationally Critical (NZ TCS)

Scientific classification
- Kingdom: Plantae
- Clade: Tracheophytes
- Clade: Angiosperms
- Clade: Eudicots
- Clade: Asterids
- Order: Lamiales
- Family: Bignoniaceae
- Genus: Tecomanthe
- Species: T. speciosa

Binomial name
- Tecomanthe speciosa W.R.B.Oliv.

= Tecomanthe speciosa =

Species of flowering plant

Tecomanthe speciosa (also known as the Three Kings vine or akapukaea) is a species of subtropical forest lianes. A single specimen was first discovered on Manawatāwhi / Three Kings Islands, 55 km (34 mi) off the northern tip of New Zealand, during a scientific survey in 1945. No other specimens have been recorded in the wild. Tecomanthe is a tropical genus otherwise unrepresented in New Zealand. Four other species of Tecomanthe occur in Queensland, Indonesia, New Guinea, and the Solomon Islands.

== Description ==
Tecomanthe speciosa is a vigorous twining climber growing up to 10 m (33 ft) in height. The glossy, thick compound leaves consist of up to five leaflets. In autumn or early winter it bears long cream-coloured tubular flowers that emerge directly from the stem in large clusters. The flowers appear to be adapted to be pollinated by bats, despite the fact that bats are not part of the present-day fauna of the Three Kings Islands (though they may once have been present). Nevertheless, the flowers of plants growing in cultivation are readily pollinated by a large number of native and exotic birds. While a subtropical plant, Tecomanthe speciosa is able to survive at temperatures as low as −2 °C, meaning domestic plants growing as south as Dunedin have been noted as surviving.

It has not yet been formally assessed for the IUCN Red List, but a preliminary assessment of the conservation status of all New Zealand vascular plants found T. speciosa to be "Nationally Critical".

== Discovery and cultivation ==
Tecomanthe speciosa may once have been common on the Three Kings. By the time of its discovery, goats that had been introduced to the islands had reduced the entire population to a single specimen on Great Island, making it one of the world's most endangered plants. The remaining specimen grew on a cliff that was too steep for the goats to reach. The original specimen still grows in the wild, and has developed more vines through the natural process of layering in the years since its discovery. While the original plant was saved from destruction by the eradication of goats from the island, the rapid regeneration of the surrounding forest has limited the amount of sunlight the plant receives. The plant was last documented fully flowering in 1946, but did not flower for the remainder of the 20th century. Light flowering was documented in the early 21st century.

After discovery of the single plant in 1945, cuttings were taken from the original plant. After a decade, the plants raised by the horticulturists finally set seed, and Tecomanthe speciosa has subsequently become popular in New Zealand gardens as a vigorous climber of tropical appearance. The plant requires warm conditions, and is very sensitive to frost, suffering damage if the temperature drops below −2 °C. It is readily grown from cuttings, layering and from seed. Seed must be sown fresh and should germinate within two weeks. The seedlings grow vigorously, and may flower within two or three years. Plants grown from cuttings may take up to five years or longer to flower.

== Gallery ==
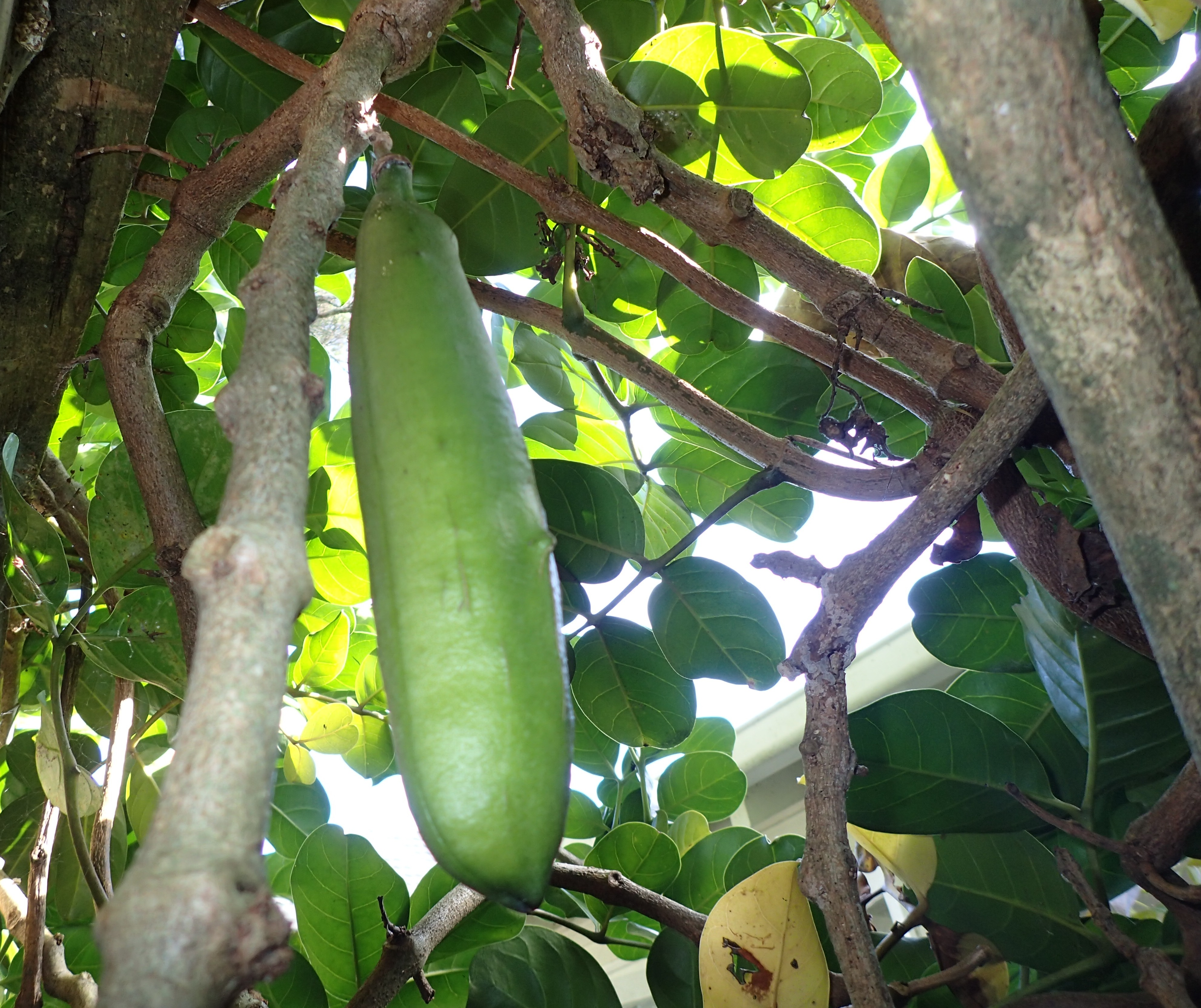
Tecomanthe speciosa seedpod, photographed midsummer

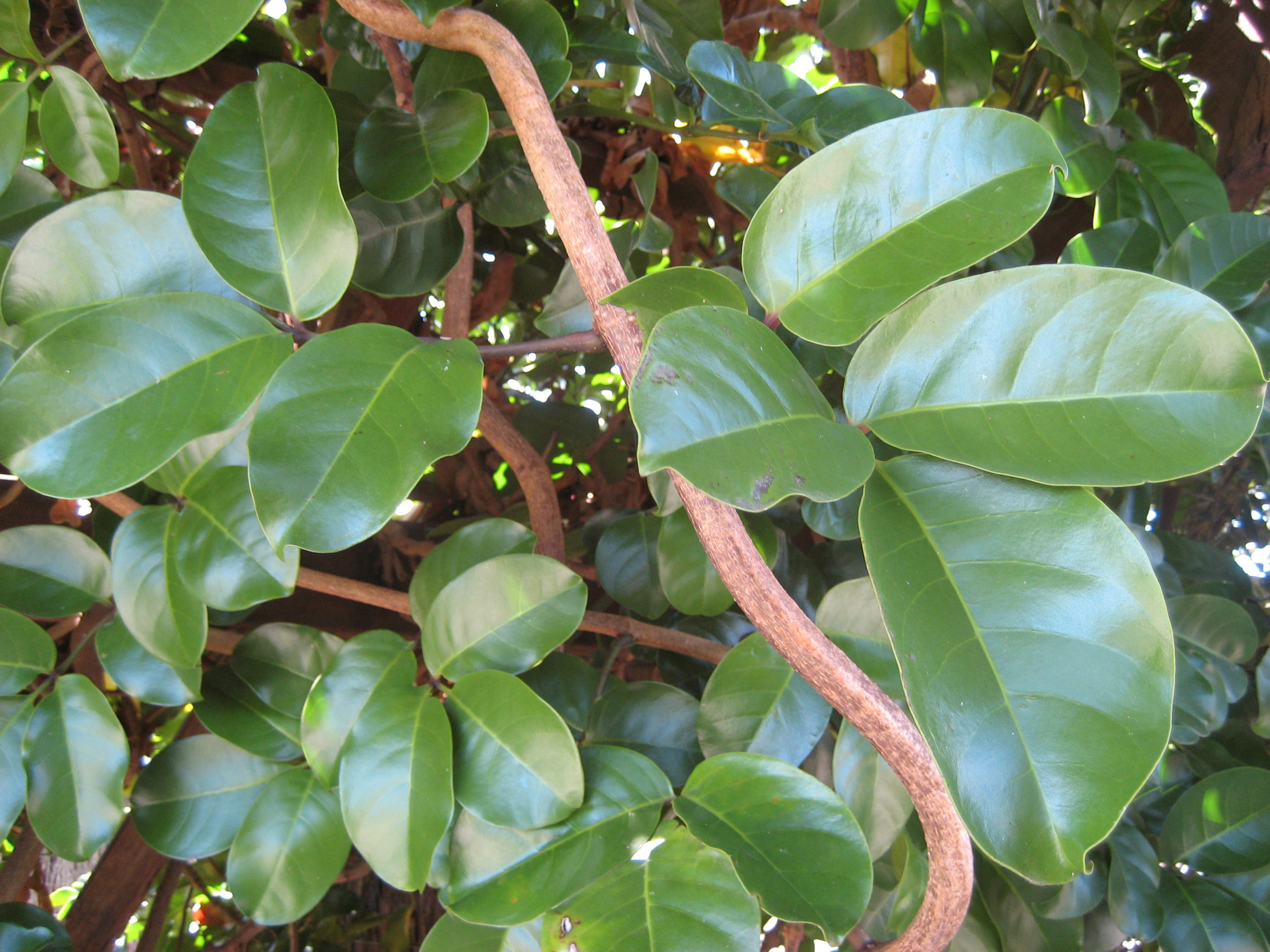
Tecomanthe speciosa is a rampant forest vine with large glossy leaves

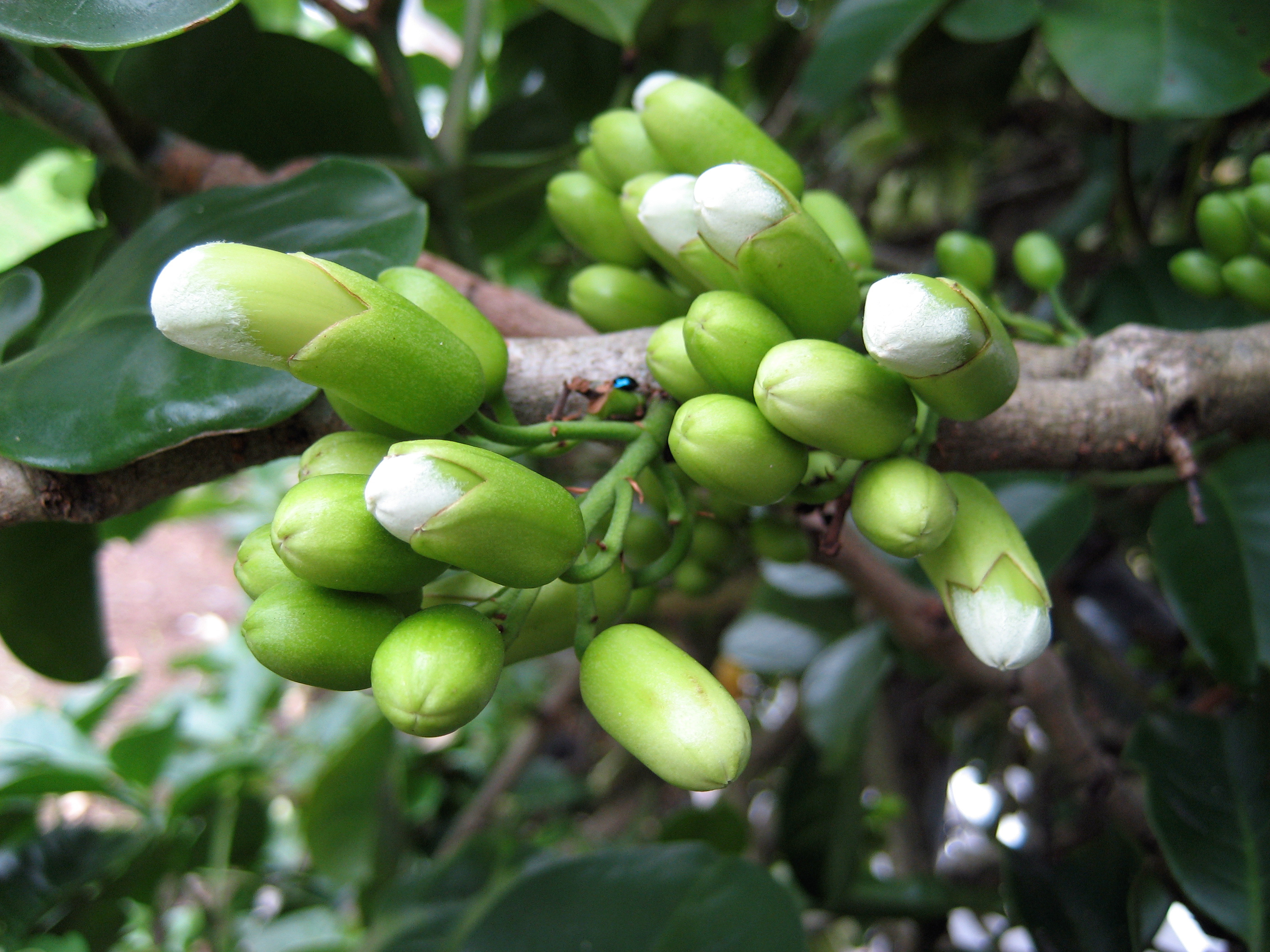
Clusters of flowerbuds arise directly from the stems in autumn or early winter
