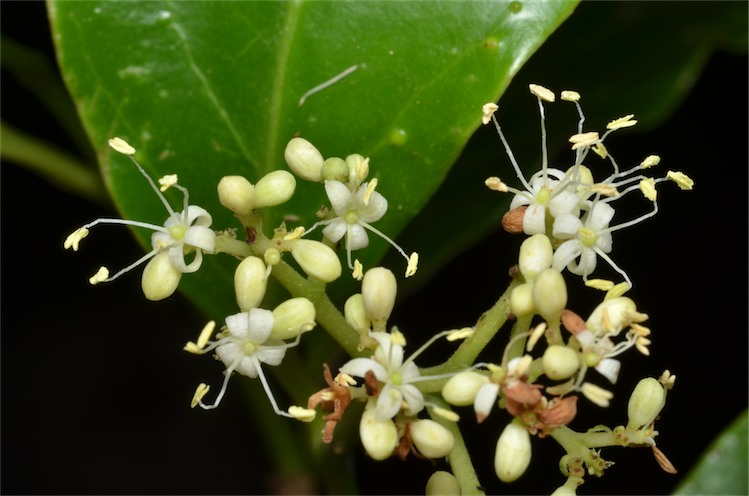
- In the Allyn Range

Conservation status
- Least Concern (IUCN 3.1)

Scientific classification
- Kingdom: Plantae
- Clade: Tracheophytes
- Clade: Angiosperms
- Clade: Eudicots
- Clade: Asterids
- Order: Apiales
- Family: Pennantiaceae
- Genus: Pennantia
- Species: P. cunninghamii

Binomial name
- Pennantia cunninghamii Miers

= Pennantia cunninghamii =

Species of tree

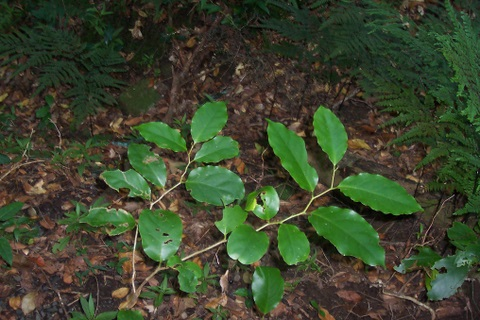
Young plant growing near Kiama

Pennantia cunninghamii, commonly known as brown beech, is a species of flowering plant in the family Pennantiaceae. It is a tree with a fluted trunk, often scaly bark, glossy, elliptic or oblong leaves, panicles of bisexual or male flowers, and fleshy black drupes.

== Description ==
Pennantia cunninghamii is a tree that typically grows to a height of up to 30 m (98 ft) and has an irregularly fluted trunk with dark grey to brown, often scaly bark and a flanged base. The leaves are elliptic or oblong, 70–180 mm (2.8–7.1 in) long and 40–80 mm (1.6–3.1 in) wide on a petiole 10–20 mm (0.39–0.79 in) long and arranged along zig-zagging branchlets. Both sides of the leaves are glossy with prominent domatia on the veins. The flowers are bisexual or male, arranged in panicles on the ends of branches or in upper leaf axils, the sepals insignificant, the petals glabrous, 3–4 mm (0.12–0.16 in) long and 1.0–1.5 mm (0.039–0.059 in) wide. Flowering occurs from November to January and the fruit is a fleshy black drupe 10–15 mm (0.39–0.59 in) long and 7–9 mm (0.28–0.35 in) wide containing a single seed.

== Taxonomy ==
Pennantia cunninghamii was first formally described in 1852 by John Miers in The Annals and Magazine of Natural History from specimens collected by Allan Cunningham in the Illawarra region. The specific epithet honours Cunningham.

== Distribution and habitat ==
Brown beech grows in rainforest from Clyde Mountain near Batemans Bay (35° S) in southern New South Wales to Atherton (17° S) in tropical Queensland.

== Ecology ==
The fruit of P. cunninghamii is eaten by grey-headed flying fox and a variety of bird species including brown cuckoo dove, green catbird, topknot pigeon, wompoo fruit-dove and white-headed pigeon. The larva of the moth Cardamyla carinentalis pupates between leaves of this species.
