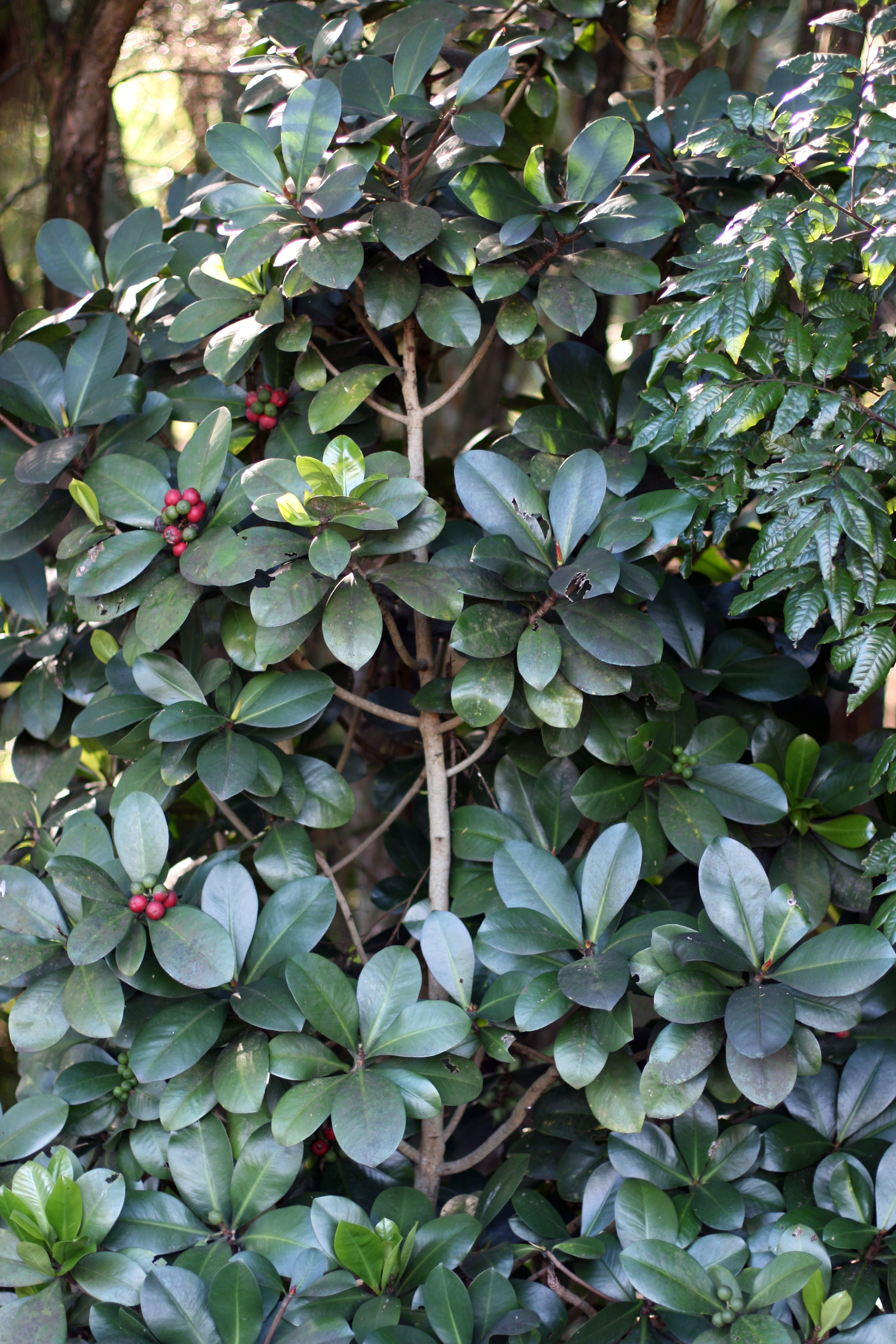

Conservation status
- Vulnerable (IUCN 2.3)

Scientific classification
- Kingdom: Plantae
- Clade: Tracheophytes
- Clade: Angiosperms
- Clade: Eudicots
- Clade: Asterids
- Order: Ericales
- Family: Primulaceae
- Subfamily: Myrsinoideae
- Genus: Elingamita; G.T.S.Baylis
- Species: E. johnsonii

Binomial name
- Elingamita johnsonii G.T.S.Baylis

= Elingamita =

Genus of trees

Elingamita is a genus in the plant family Primulaceae. It consists of a single species, Elingamita johnsonii, a tree or shrub endemic to the Three Kings Islands approximately 55 km north of the North Island of New Zealand. The entire world natural population of the tree is confined to a small rocky island and two nearby islets, and thus is vulnerable to destruction by fire or other unforeseen events. Elingamita johnsonii grows as a shrub or small tree in pōhutukawa (Metrosideros excelsa) forest and coastal scrub on West island. It also occurs on two rocky islets of the Princes Group; on one of these islets, Hinemoa Rock, it grows as an emergent canopy tree in exposed places. The relationship of Elingamita to other genera of the Primulaceae (formerly Myrsinaceae) remains to be properly established. Discovered in 1950, Elingamita johnsonii takes its name from the steamer Elingamite, which was wrecked on West Island in 1902. The natural range is currently free of rodents, but the fruit is known to be very palatable to rats.

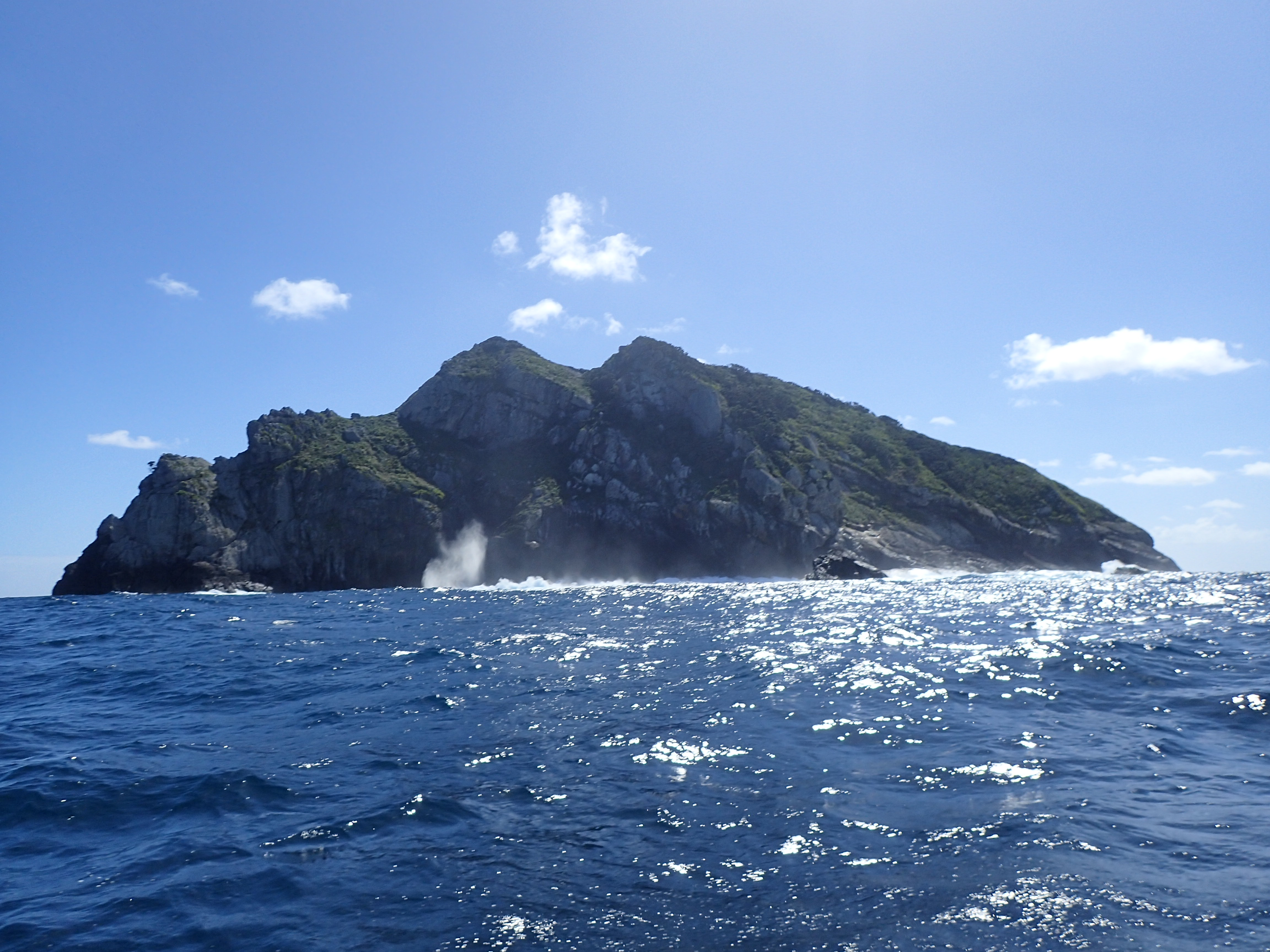
Ohau/West Island, From the West

== Description ==
Elingamita johnsonii is a stoutly branched tree up to 8 m tall, but usually much less than that. The bark is grey and smooth. The dark green leaves, 10 to 18 cm long and 4 to 9 cm wide, are smooth with a satin-like gloss. The leaf stems are short, about 1 cm long. The tiny, pale yellow to pink flowers appear in terminal panicles between February and May, and sometimes also between August and November. Male and female flowers generally occur on separate trees. The attractive grape-like bunches of red fruit take a year or more to ripen. Each fruit is a globe-shaped drupe up to 20 mm in diameter which encloses a single seed. While the foliage could be mistaken for that of a karaka tree (Corynocarpus laevigatus), the petiole or leaf stalk is much shorter and the bunches of red, fleshy fruit are very distinctive and may be seen on the tree at any time of the year. The fruits are edible, the white flesh tasting like a salty apple.

Detailed views

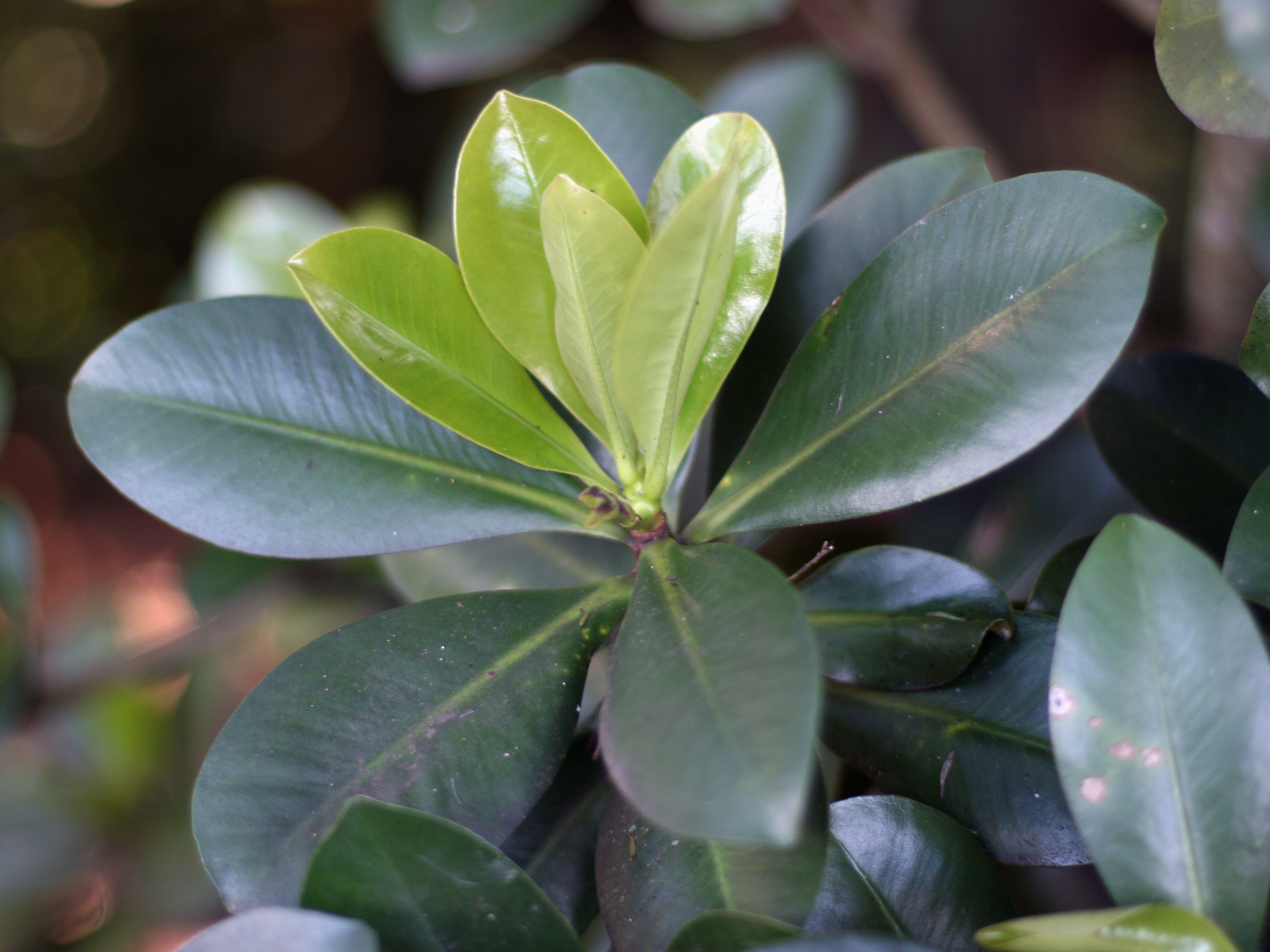
Elingamita johnsonii has large, glossy, dark-green leaves.

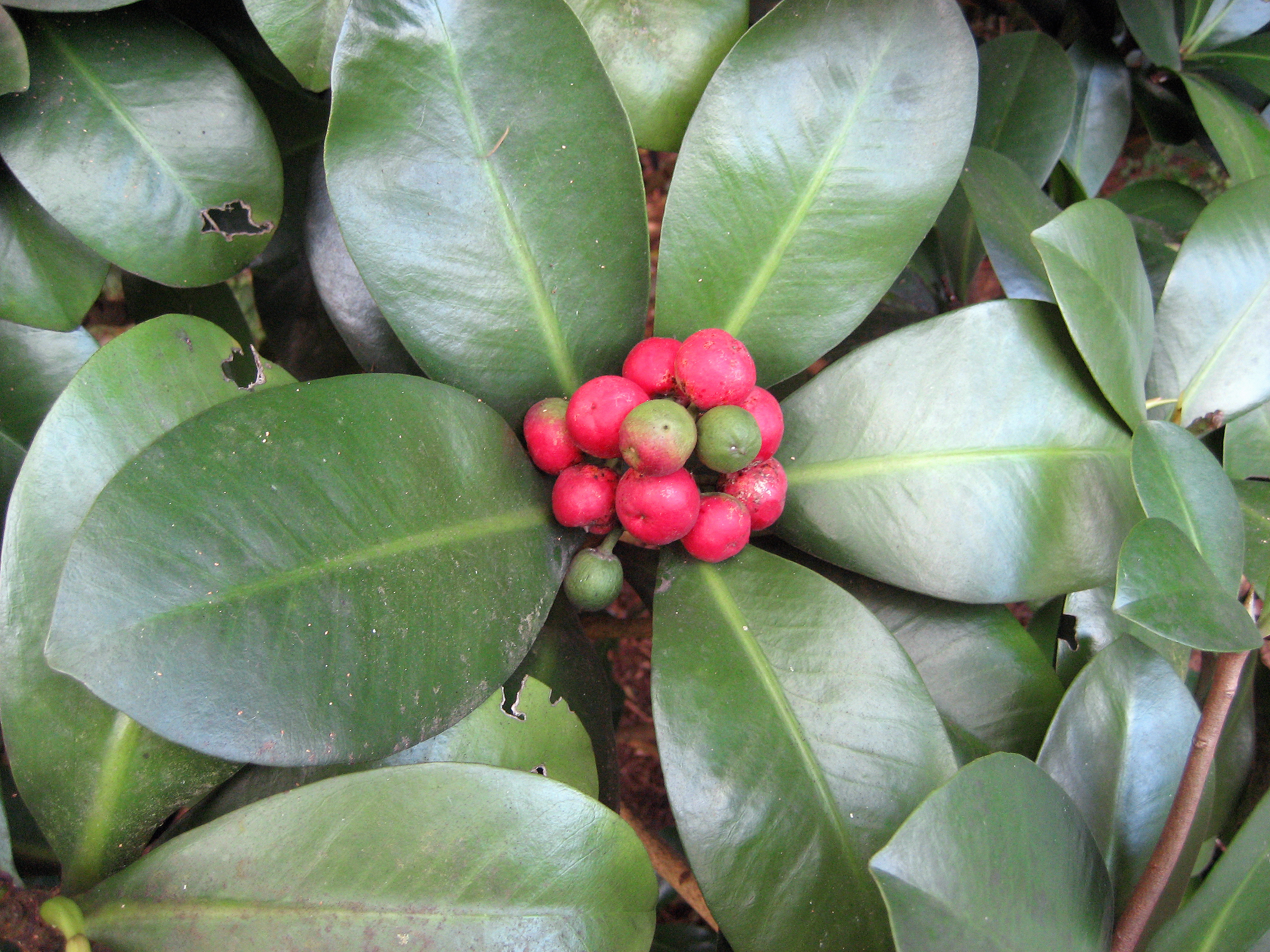
The distinctive red fleshy fruits take a year to ripen.

== Propagation ==
The plant is sometimes available for sale by specialist nurseries. Propagation is easy from seed although it may take a year to germinate. Seedlings are vigorous and thrive in semi-shade and prefer a fertile, free draining soil. Once they are established, plants do well in full sun. Cuttings are slow to strike. Male and female plants are required for the production of fruit to ensure that fruit are produced. In gardens, Elingamita johnsonii makes an excellent specimen tree for frost-free areas. It is highly sensitive to cold and intolerant of frost.
