= Val Chapman =

New Zealand botanist, university professor, conservationist (1910–1980)

Val Chapman OBE
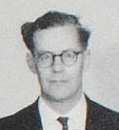
- Chapman in 1962

Auckland City Councillor
- In office 1954–1956
- In office 1960–1961

Personal details
- Born: Valentine Jackson Chapman; 14 February 1910 Alcester, Warwickshire, England
- Died: 5 December 1980 (aged 70) Auckland, New Zealand
- Spouse: Phyllis Claire Parks (m. 1938)
- Children: 3
- Scientific career
- Education: University of Cambridge
- Fields: Botany
- Workplaces: Victoria University of Manchester; University of Auckland
- Thesis: The operation of tides in controlling salt marsh vegetation (1935)
- Author abbrev. (botany): V.J.Chapm.

Valentine Jackson Chapman OBE (14 February 1910 – 5 December 1980) was a New Zealand botanist, university professor, and conservationist.

== Biography ==
He was born in Alcester, Warwickshire, England, on 14 February 1910.

Chapman was an associate of Auckland mayor Dove-Myer Robinson, and was a member of the Auckland Metropolitan Drainage Board between 1955 and 1956. He was a member of the Auckland City Council, winning two by-elections in 1954 and 1961. Despite these successes, he was defeated in both subsequent elections in 1956 and 1962, missing out by only 172 votes in the latter election.

In the 1974 New Year Honours, Chapman was appointed an Officer of the Order of the British Empire, for academic and public services. In 1977, he was awarded the Queen Elizabeth II Silver Jubilee Medal.

Chapman died in Auckland on 5 December 1980.

== Selected publications ==
- Seaweeds and Their Uses, 1970

The standard author abbreviation V.J.Chapm. is used to indicate this person as the author when citing a botanical name.
