= Geoff Baylis =

New Zealand botanist (1913–2003)

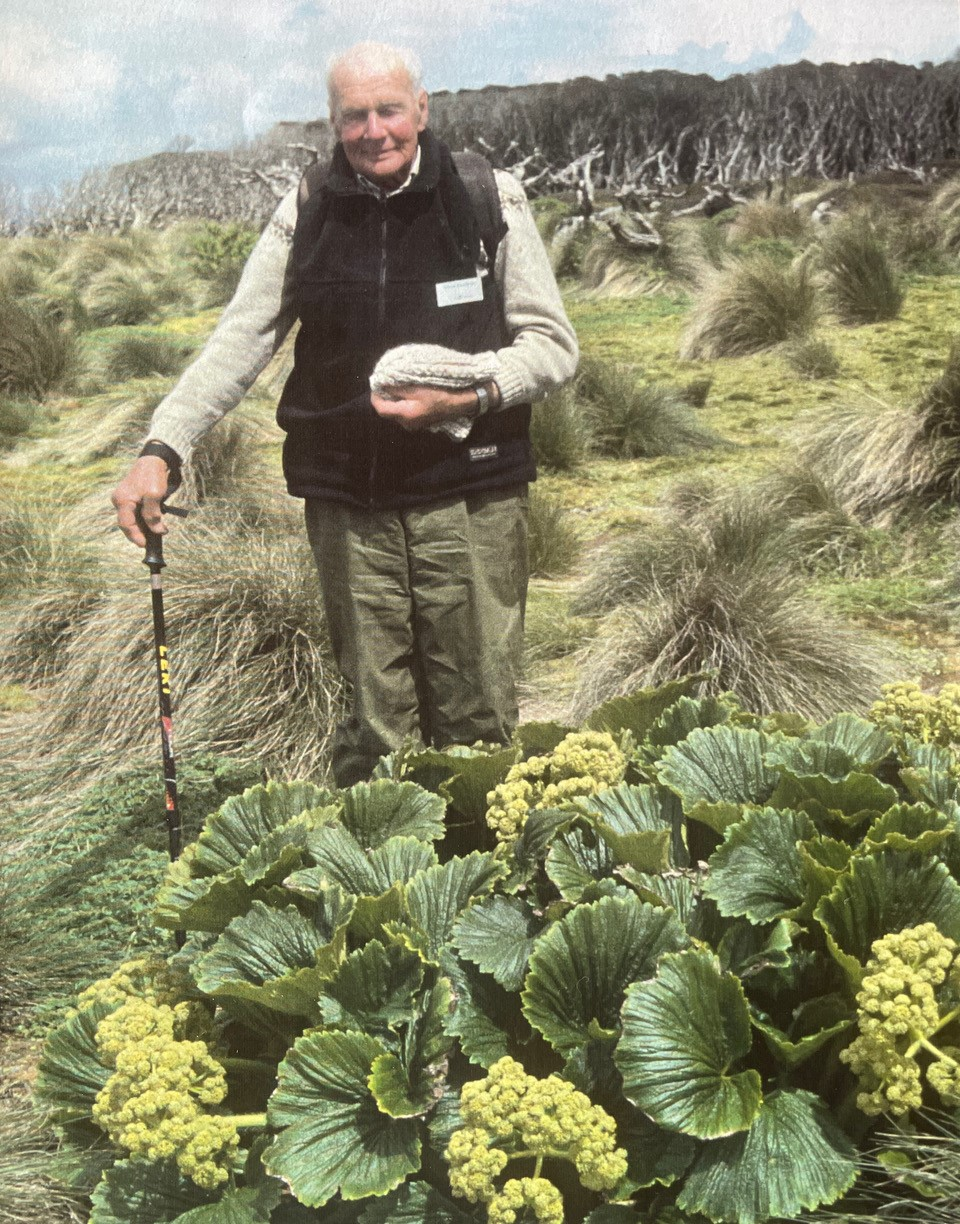
- Born: 24 November 1913; Palmerston North
- Died: 31 December 2003
- Occupations: Botanist; mycologist; botanical collector; scientific collector
- Parents: Gerald Thomas de Sandford Baylis (father); Kathleen Daisy Baylis (mother)
- Relatives: Geraldine Chamberlain
- Awards: Fellow of the Royal Society Te Apārangi (1961); honorary doctor of Massey University (2006, Honorary Doctor of Letters)
- Scientific career
- Thesis: The influence of certain fungi on the germination of peas; and, A physiological study of the pathogenicity of several species of Sclerotinia, Some observations on Avicennia officinalis Linn in New Zealand
- Academic advisors: Olga Livia Gertrude Adams, William Brown
- Doctoral students: Peter Johnson, Ian Hall
- Author abbrev. (botany): G.T.S.Baylis

Geoffrey Thomas Sandford Baylis (24 November 1913 – 31 December 2003) was a New Zealand botanist and Emeritus Professor specialising in plant pathology and mycorrhiza. He was employed at the University of Otago for 34 years undertaking research into plant and fungal ecology and symbiotic interactions, taxonomy and anatomy. He collected hundreds of plant specimens in the field and founded the Otago Regional Herbarium (OTA). He discovered the sole Pennantia baylisiana living on Three Kings Island in 1945, and was elected as a Fellow of the Royal Society of New Zealand in 1961.

== Early life and education ==
Baylis was born in Palmerston North to Gerald Baylis, an agricultural scientist, and his wife Daisy (Kathleen Daisy Baylis (née Aston), sister of New Zealand botanist Bernard Aston. The family moved to Campbells Bay on Auckland's North Shore in 1920, where Geoff and his sister Geraldine attended Takapuna Primary School and were then some of the first students at Campbells Bay School.

Baylis attended Takapuna Grammar School before enrolling at Auckland University College in 1931. In 1935, he earned his MSc on the ecology of the mangrove Avicennia resinifera (now Avicennia marina subsp. australasia) with a thesis entitled, "Some observations on Avicennia officinalis Linn in New Zealand". In 1936, a scholarship enabled Baylis to attend London Imperial College where he gained his PhD in 1938 in Plant Pathology. His PhD thesis was entitled, "The influence of certain fungi on the germination of peas; and, A physiological study of the pathogenicity of several species of Sclerotinia".

On returning to New Zealand, Baylis joined the DSIR at Lincoln where he researched diseases of linen flax (Linum usitatissimum). In 1940, he volunteered for the Royal New Zealand Navy. During his World War II service he served on board HMS Crocus on Atlantic convoy duty.

== Professional life ==
In 1946, he was appointed lecturer-in-charge of botany at University of Otago, taking over from John Holloway. He became first professor of botany (1952) and was head of department for 34 years, retiring in 1978. Based on his numerous plant collections, Baylis founded the Otago Regional Herbarium (OTA), which is located at the Botany Department at the University of Otago.

Through his research, Baylis made several important contributions to our understanding of the role of mycorrhizae, or the symbiotic relationship between plant roots and soil fungi. His pioneering experiments on endomycorrhizae in broadleaf (Griselinia littoralis) showed that seedlings growing in natural soils develop vescicular-arbuscular mycorrhizae by associating with fungi that assist with phosphorus uptake, whereas seedlings that did not develop such mycorrhizae stagnated. Other researchers at the University of Otago (including Baylis and his research students) and elsewhere completed similar studies on other plants thereby extending his early results.

== Honours and awards ==
He was elected a Fellow of the Royal Society of New Zealand in 1961, and attended his last Fellows' AGM on his 90th birthday, as one of the two longest serving living fellows. He served on the Otago Museum Trust Board as the University's Representative. He received the Royal Society's Hutton Medal in 1994; he was a foundation and life-long member and President of the New Zealand Ecological Society; and in 1997 he was elected an Associate of Honour of the Royal New Zealand Institute of Horticulture. He also served for many years on the Catlins Forest Park Advisory Committee. In 1959, Geoff became one of the three founding Governors of the Hellaby Grasslands Trust, a position he maintained for 42 years.

The annual Geoff Baylis Lecture was established by the Botanical Society of Otago in 2002 to honour his contributions to the society and field of botany. Geoff Baylis was the speaker at the inaugural lecture in 2002, and as of 2022 there have been a total of 20 different lectures and speakers in the intervening years.

The standard author abbreviation G.T.S.Baylis is used to indicate this person as the author when citing a botanical name.

== Eponymy ==
The following species of plants and fungi have been named in honour of Geoff Baylis:

- The critically endangered tree, Pennantia baylisiana (W.R.B.Oliv) G.T.S.Baylis, or Three Kings kaikōmako.
- The liverwort Plagiochila baylisii Inoue & R.M.Schust., which was thought to be endemic to Fiordland, South Island, New Zealand but is also known from Tasmania, Australia.
- The critically endangered secotioid fungus Deconica baylisiana (E. Horak) J.A. Cooper (originally described by Egon Horak in 1971 as Nivatogastrium baylisianum E. Horak).

== Family and personal life ==
In his younger years, Baylis was an avid mountaineer and took part in several climbing trips to the Southern Alps. In 1965 he and his climbing companions had to be rescued by plane after being trapped by bad weather on the Volta Glacier.

Baylis flatted in, and later bought, the historic Dunedin house "Threave" in upper High Street, a Robert Lawson-designed house which he fully restored, as well as extending the building's woodland surrounds. He became a collector of art and antique silverware and porcelain, and was a regular attendee at classical music concerts. He also had an extensive garden which contained both native and exotic species.

Geoff remained unmarried throughout his life, but kept close ties with his sister Genevieve Chamberlain and her family. He moved back to Campbells Bay, next door to the original family home (which he had bought and restored for his nephew Geoffrey Chamberlain). He died there on New Year's Eve, 2003, at the age of 90.

== Taxon names authored ==
Geoff Balyis named seven species in four different genera of plants.

- Elingamita G.T.S.Baylis
- Elingamita johnsonii G.T.S.Baylis
- Pennantia baylisiana (W.R.B.Oliv) G.T.S.Baylis
- Solanum aviculare var. latifolium G.T.S.Baylis
- Solanum capsiciforme (Domin) G.T.S.Baylis

== Selected works ==
- Baylis, Geoffrey Thomas Sandford Sanford (1935). Some observations on Avicennia officinalis Linn in New Zealand (master's degree thesis). Auckland: University of New Zealand. Wikidata Q114901240.
- Baylis, Geoffrey Thomas Sandford Sanford (1938). The influence of certain fungi on the germination of peas; and, A physiological study of the pathogenicity of several species of Sclerotinia (Thesis). London: Imperial College London. doi:10.25560/95480. Wikidata Q114900838.
- Baylis, Geoffrey Thomas Sandford Sanford (1940). "Leaf anatomy of the New Zealand mangrove" (PDF). Transactions and Proceedings of the Royal Society of New Zealand. 70: 164–170. ISSN 1176-6166. Wikidata Q89182598.
- Baylis, Geoffrey Thomas Sandford Sanford (1954). "Rust fungi on New Zealand Clematis" (PDF). Transactions of the Royal Society of New Zealand. 82: 633–637. ISSN 0035-9181. Wikidata Q89183489.
- Baylis, Geoffrey Thomas Sandford Sanford (1958). "A Botanical Survey of the Small Islands of the Three Kings Group". Records of the Auckland Institute and Museum. 5: 1–12. JSTOR 42906087. Wikidata Q58676758.
- Baylis, Geoffrey Thomas Sandford Sanford (1959). "Effect of vesicular-arbusuclar mycorrhizas ongrowth of Griselinia littoralis (Cornaceae)". New Phytologist. 58 (3): 274–278. doi:10.1111/j.1469-8137.1959.tb05358.x. Wikidata Q113831233.
- Baylis, Geoffrey Thomas Sandford Sanford (1961), The significance of mycorrhizas and root nodules in New Zealand vegetation, vol. 89, pp. 45–50, Wikidata Q114902717
- Baylis, Geoffrey Thomas Sandford Sanford (1967). "Experiments on the ecological significance of phycomycetous mycorrhizas". New Phytologist. 66 (2): 231–243. doi:10.1111/j.1469-8137.1967.tb06001.x. Wikidata Q56503745.
- Baylis, Geoffrey Thomas Sandford Sanford (1969). "Synthesis of mycorrhizas in Podocarpus and Agathis with endogone wpores". Nature. 221 (5187): 1267–1268. doi:10.1038/2211267b0. Wikidata Q58975972.
- Baylis, Geoffrey Thomas Sandford Sanford (1969). "Mycorrhizal nodules and growth of Podocarpus in nitrogen-poor soil". Nature. 223 (5213): 1385–1386. doi:10.1038/2231385a0. Wikidata Q59093467.
- Baylis, Geoffrey Thomas Sandford Sanford (1970). "Root hairs and phycomycetous mycorrhizas in phosphorus-deficient soil". Plant and Soil. 33 (1–3): 713–716. doi:10.1007/bf01378261. Wikidata Q113401845.
- Mark, Alan Francis; Baylis, Geoffrey Thomas Sandford Sanford; Dickinson, Katharine Josephine Mary (1991). "Monitoring the impacts of deer on vegetation condition of Secretary Island, Fiordland National Park, New Zealand: A clear case for deer control and ecological restoration". Journal of the Royal Society of New Zealand. 21 (1): 43–54. doi:10.1080/03036758.1991.10416109. Wikidata Q56974937.

== Image Gallery ==
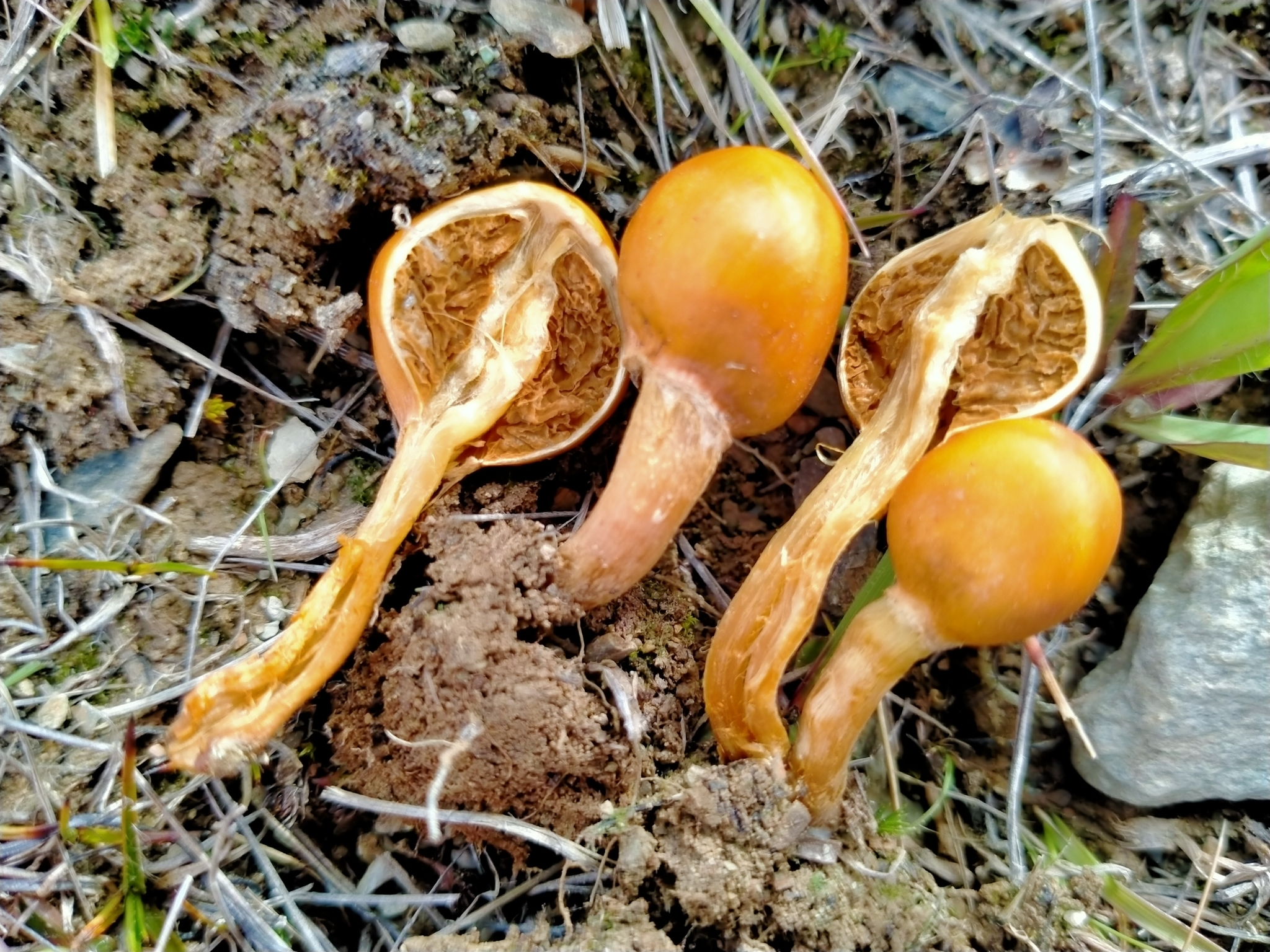
Deconica baylisiana growing at Mt Kyeburn in New Zealand

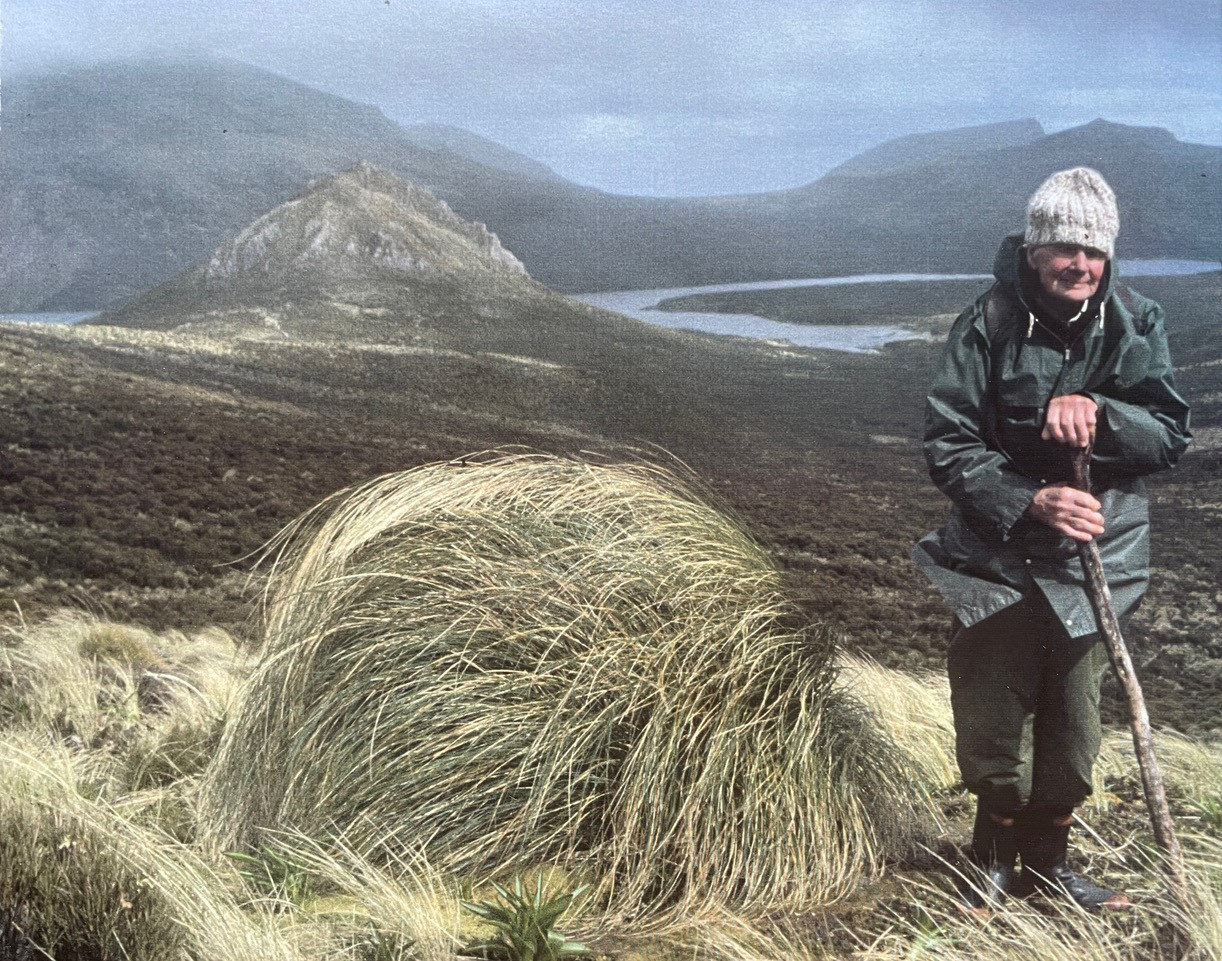
Geoff Baylis with Chionochloa antarctica on Campbell Island, Auckland Islands, November 2000, photo by Alan Mark

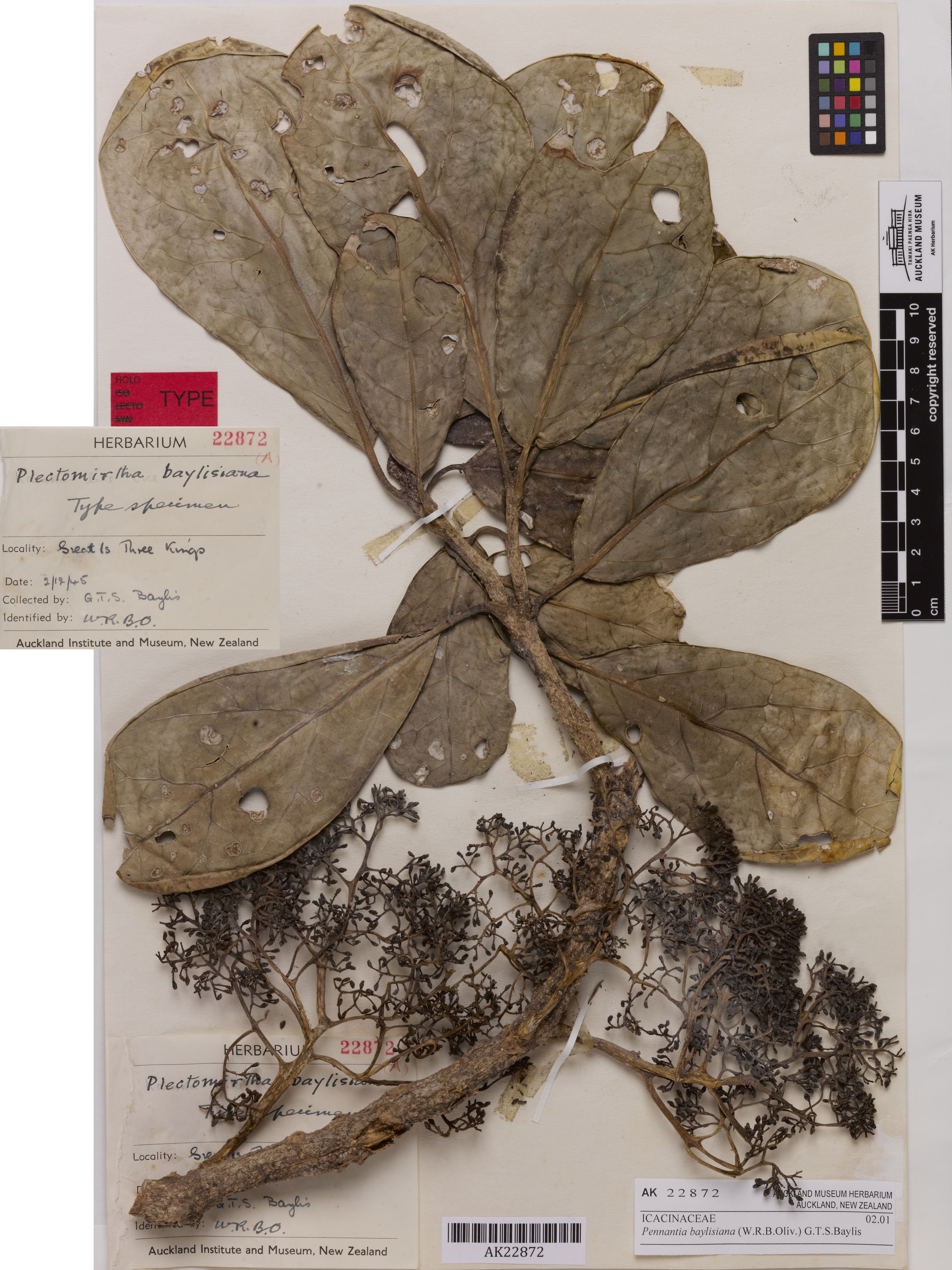
Pennantia baylisiana herbarium specimen collected by Geoff Baylis
