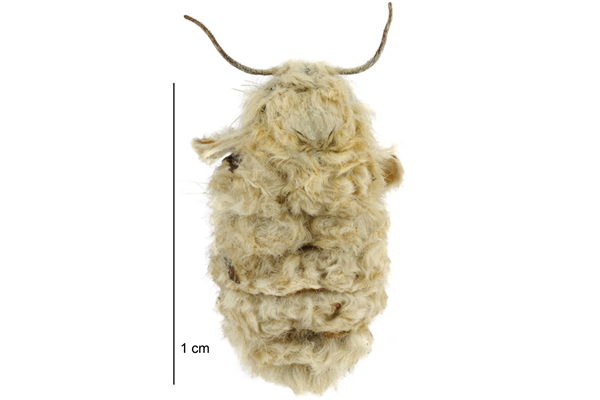
- Female specimen
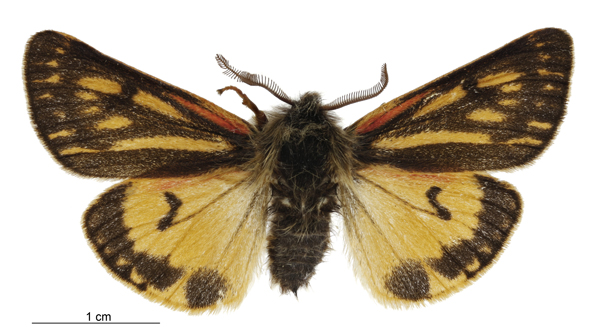
- Male specimen

Scientific classification
- Kingdom: Animalia
- Phylum: Arthropoda
- Clade: Pancrustacea
- Class: Insecta
- Order: Lepidoptera
- Superfamily: Noctuoidea
- Family: Erebidae
- Subfamily: Arctiinae
- Genus: Metacrias
- Species: M. erichrysa

Binomial name
- Metacrias erichrysa Meyrick, 1886

= Metacrias erichrysa =

Species of moth

Metacrias erichrysa, also known as the western tiger moth, is a species of moth of the family Erebidae. It is endemic to New Zealand. This species can be found in the lower half of the North Island and western alpine areas of the South Island. The adult female of the species is flightless and buff coloured whereas the male is brightly coloured and a rapid flier during daylight hours. The male of the species is on the wing from mid-November to early January. The species inhabits open herb and tussock fields in mountainous terrain at altitudes of between 900 and 1200 m. Larvae feed on Brachyglottis bellidioides, Festuca novae-zealandiae and indigenous species from the genera Acaena, Muehlenbeckia, Wahlenbergia and Raoulia.

== Taxonomy ==
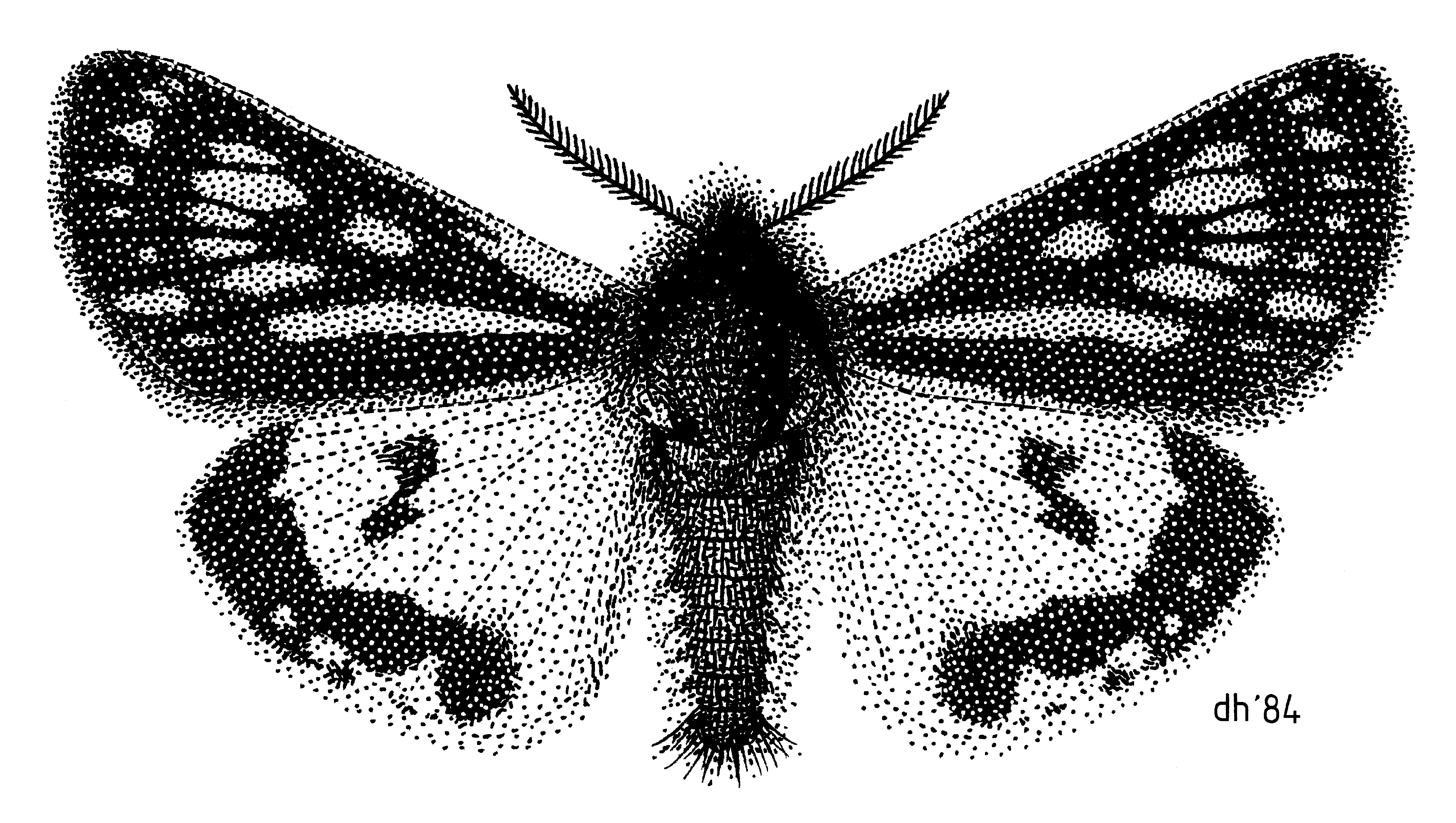
Metacria erichrysa illustration by Des Helmore

M. erichrysa was originally described by Edward Meyrick in 1886 from specimens collected on Mount Arthur as well as from subsequently reared larvae. George Hudson discussed and illustrated the species in his 1898 publication New Zealand moths and butterflies (Macro-lepidoptera) as well as in his 1928 book The Butterflies and Moths of New Zealand. The holotype specimen is held at the Natural History Museum, London.

== Description ==
Adults males are brightly coloured and diurnal, while females are buff coloured and short-winged.

Meyrick in his 1886 paper described the species as follows:

♂ 31-33 mm. Head, palpi, antennae, and thorax black; hairs beneath thorax and partly above tending to become pale grey towards tips. Abdomen black, marked with yellow on sides and sometimes beneath. Legs yellow-ochreous. Forewings elongate triangular, costa straight, apex obtuse, hindmargin strongly rounded, rather oblique; vein 10 separate; black; markings orange-yellow; a slender costal streak, much dilated on basal fourth; a slender dorsal streak; a wedgeshaped discal spot before middle; a moderately broad streak along submedian fold from near base to 3/4; a curved discal series of five elongate spots about 2/3; a subterminal series of eight dots or small spots, more or less connected by fine longitudinal lines with hindmargin : cilia pale ochreous-yellow, basal half blackish. Hind wings orange-yellow; a curved black transverse discal spot; a moderate irregular-edged black hindmarginal band, on upper half containing three or four yellow dots, on lower half with an elongate orange-yellow marginal spot sending an acute projection to inner edge of band near anal angle; cilia pale ochreous-yellow, on upper half black at base.

♀ Wholly whitish-ochreous; wings minute, aborted; legs short, stout, well-developed.

Larva wholly black; hairs black, those covering segmental incisions brownish-ochreous.

== Distribution ==
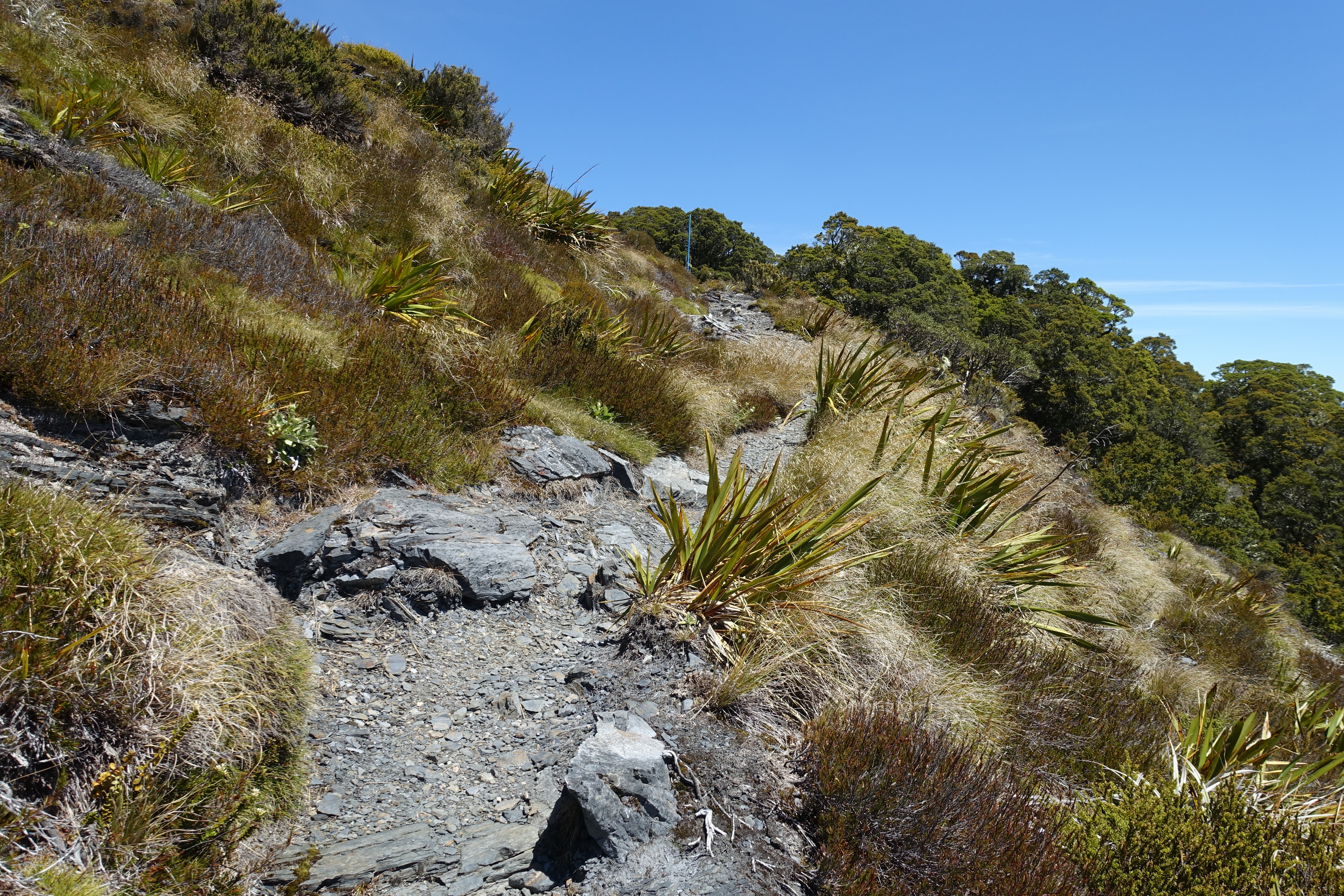
Habitat at the type locality of Mount Arthur.

This species is endemic to New Zealand, where it is known from the western alpine areas of the South Island and mountains of the lower half of the North Island.

== Biology and behaviour ==
The females remain within their cocoon for mating and egg-laying. Once hatched the larvae first feed on her corpse. They then disperse widely. Larvae are present from mid summer until winter, when they commence larval diapause. The pupa is enclosed in a slight cocoon. Some larvae construct a 'nest' inside which they spin their cocoon. Cocoons are attached to any covering rock rather than to the ground or rocks below. It has been hypothesised that these behaviours are likely to protect the cocoon against melting snow.

The male adults of this species are on the wing in mid November to early January. They fly rapidly and are difficult to catch. Males are attracted to females by pheromones. Males of this species can be attracted to the scent of females of different species within their genus. Researchers have used females as lures to take advantage of this behaviour to detect males in new localities.

== Habitat and host-plants ==
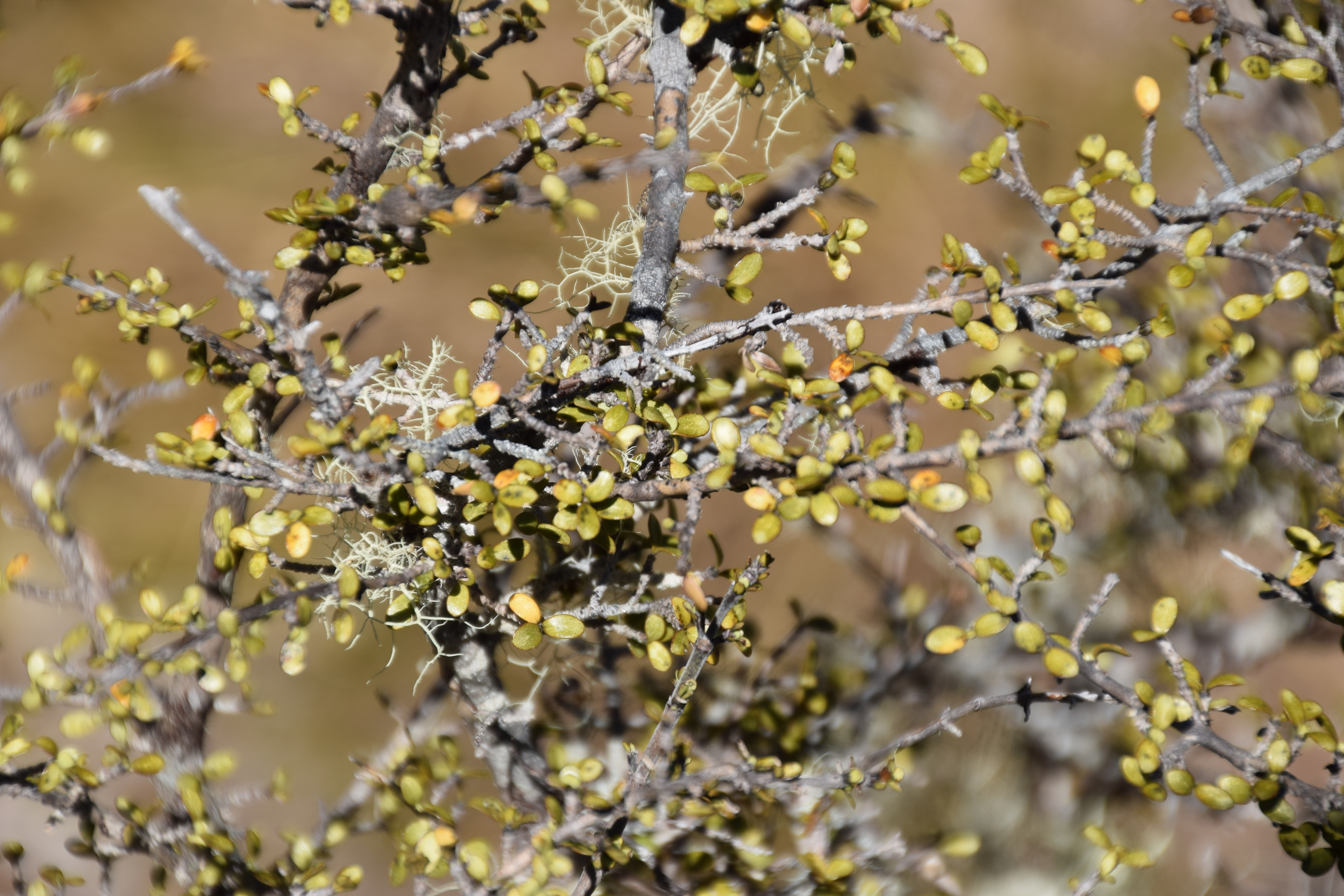
Brachyglottis bellidioides

The adult moths prefer open herb and tussock fields in mountainous terrain at altitudes of between 900 and 1200 m. The larvae feed on Brachyglottis bellidioides as well as other grasses and herbs. Endemic plants that M. erichrysa larvae feed on include Festuca novae-zealandiae and indigenous species from the genera Acaena, Muehlenbeckia, Wahlenbergia and Raoulia.
