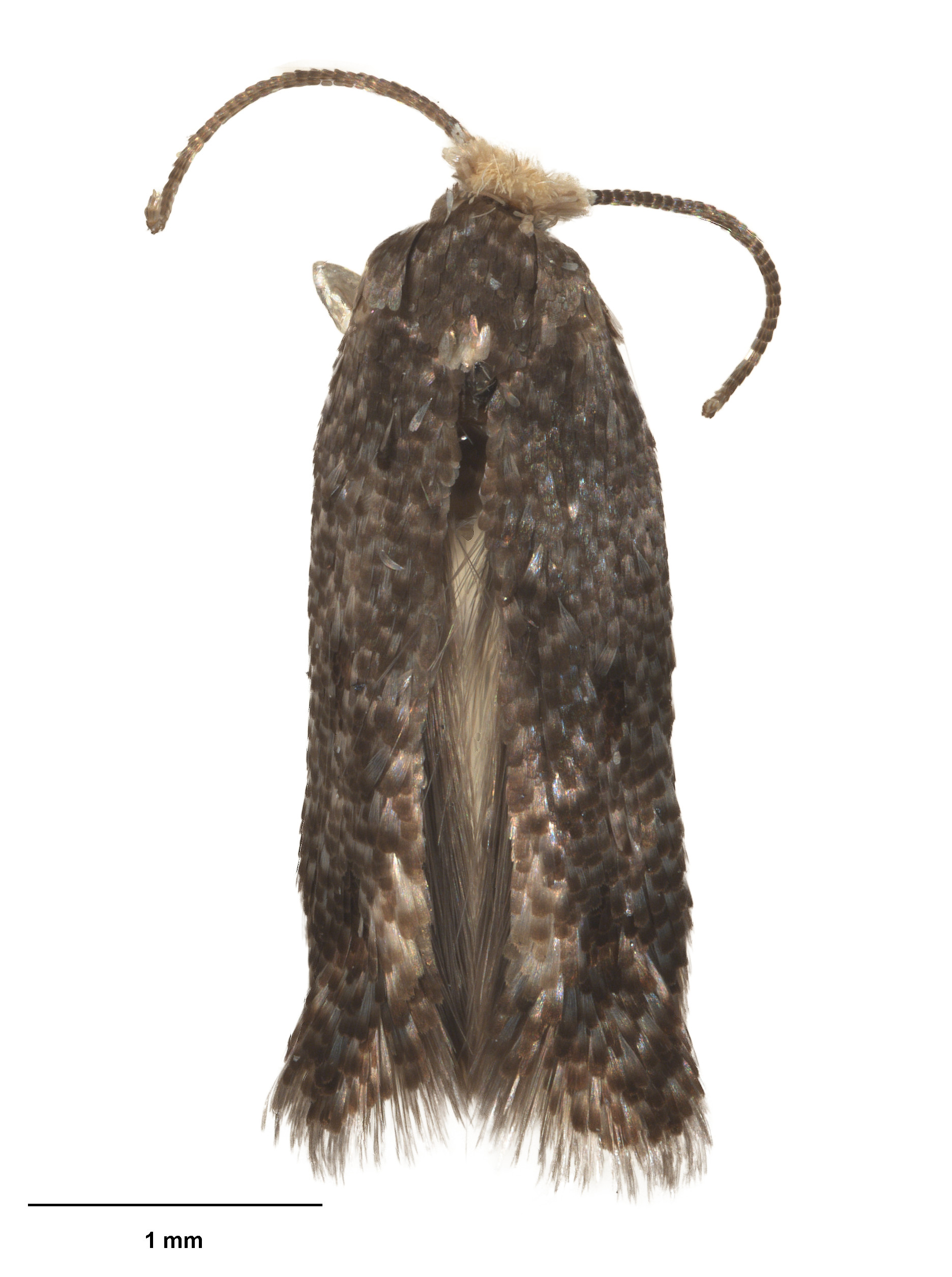
- Holotype specimen

Scientific classification
- Kingdom: Animalia
- Phylum: Arthropoda
- Clade: Pancrustacea
- Class: Insecta
- Order: Lepidoptera
- Family: Nepticulidae
- Genus: Stigmella
- Species: S. atrata

Binomial name
- Stigmella atrata Donner & Wilkinson, 1989

= Stigmella atrata =

Species of moth endemic to New Zealand

Stigmella atrata is a moth of the family Nepticulidae. It is endemic to New Zealand and has been observed on the North Island, South Island and Stewart Island. The larvae of this species are leaf miners of Brachyglottis elaeagnifolia and Brachyglottis rotundifolia and have been recorded in April, May, July and September. Larvae pupate on the ground in a cocoon. Adults have been observed on the wing in January, February, November and December. It has been hypothesised that there is probably only one generation per year.

== Taxonomy ==
This species was first described in 1989 by Hans Donner and Christopher Wilkinson using a variety of specimens. The male holotype specimen was collected at Golden Bay, Stewart Island by Morris Netterville Watt and emerged mid November 1959. It is held at the New Zealand Arthropod Collection.

== Description ==
The larvae are about 4 mm long and are pale brown. The length of the forewings of the adult moth is about 4 mm. Donner and Wilkinson described the male of the species as follows:

Head. Frontal tuft yellowish brown; scape buff with some brown scales; collar brown-grey; antenna brown, comprising 37 segments. Thorax grey-brown, lustrous, reflecting gold. Forewing about 4 mm long, grey-brown, iridescent, reflecting gold, with an indistinct dark medial spot; terminal quarter darker; terminal scales overlapping the brown-grey fringe. Hindwing brown-grey; fringe grey. Abdomen brown-grey.

The female of the species was described as follows:

As for male, but forewing with contrasting areas submedially and antemedially, these varying in size and colour fτom shining white and covering major part of wing to pale brown, obscure patches.

== Distribution ==
This species is endemic to New Zealand. It has been observed in the North Island, South Island and Stewart Island.

== Behaviour ==
The larvae of this species mine the leaves of their host plants. Adults have been recorded as being on the wing in January, February, November and December. There is probably one generation per year.

== Host species ==
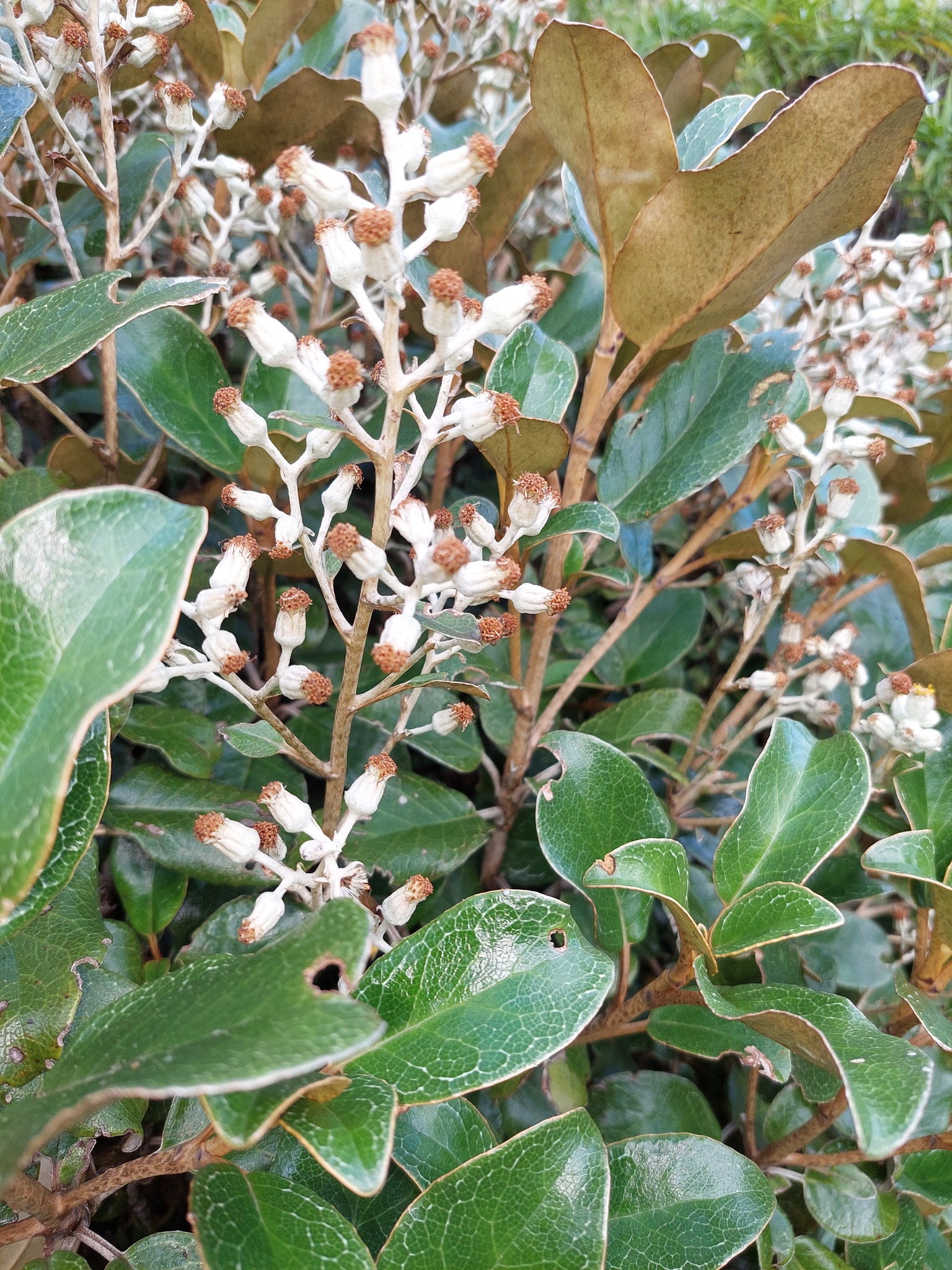
Host plant B. elaeagnifolia.

The larvae feed on Brachyglottis elaeagnifolia and Brachyglottis rotundifolia.
