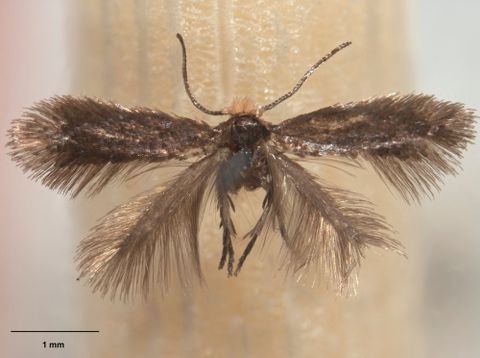
- Male holotype

Scientific classification
- Kingdom: Animalia
- Phylum: Arthropoda
- Clade: Pancrustacea
- Class: Insecta
- Order: Lepidoptera
- Family: Nepticulidae
- Genus: Stigmella
- Species: S. platina

Binomial name
- Stigmella platina Donner & Wilkinson, 1989

= Stigmella platina =

Species of moth endemic to New Zealand

Stigmella platina is a species of moth in the family Nepticulidae. It was first described by Hans Donner and Christopher Wilkinson in 1989. It is endemic to New Zealand and has been observed in both the North and South Islands at Arthur's Pass and Kapuni Valley in Egmont National Park. The larvae are leaf miners, and the likely larval host plant is Brachyglottis elaeagnifolia. Adults are on the wing in January and February.

== Taxonomy ==
This species was first described by Hans Donner and Christopher Wilkinson in 1989. The male holotype, collected at Arthur's Pass at 2700 ft [810 m] in January, is held at Te Papa.

== Description ==
Donner and Wilkinson described this species as follows:

Head. Frontal tuft and scape brownish white; collar white; antenna dark grey, comprising 30 segments. Thorax silvery grey. Forewing about 3 mm long, silvery grey speckled with black, lustrous, reflecting platinum; fringe pale grey. Hindwing and fringe silvery grey. Abdomen pale brown.

== Distribution ==
This species is endemic to New Zealand. Other than its type locality, this species has been observed at Kapuni Valley in Egmont National Park.

== Behaviour ==
Adults are on the wing in January and February.

== Host species ==
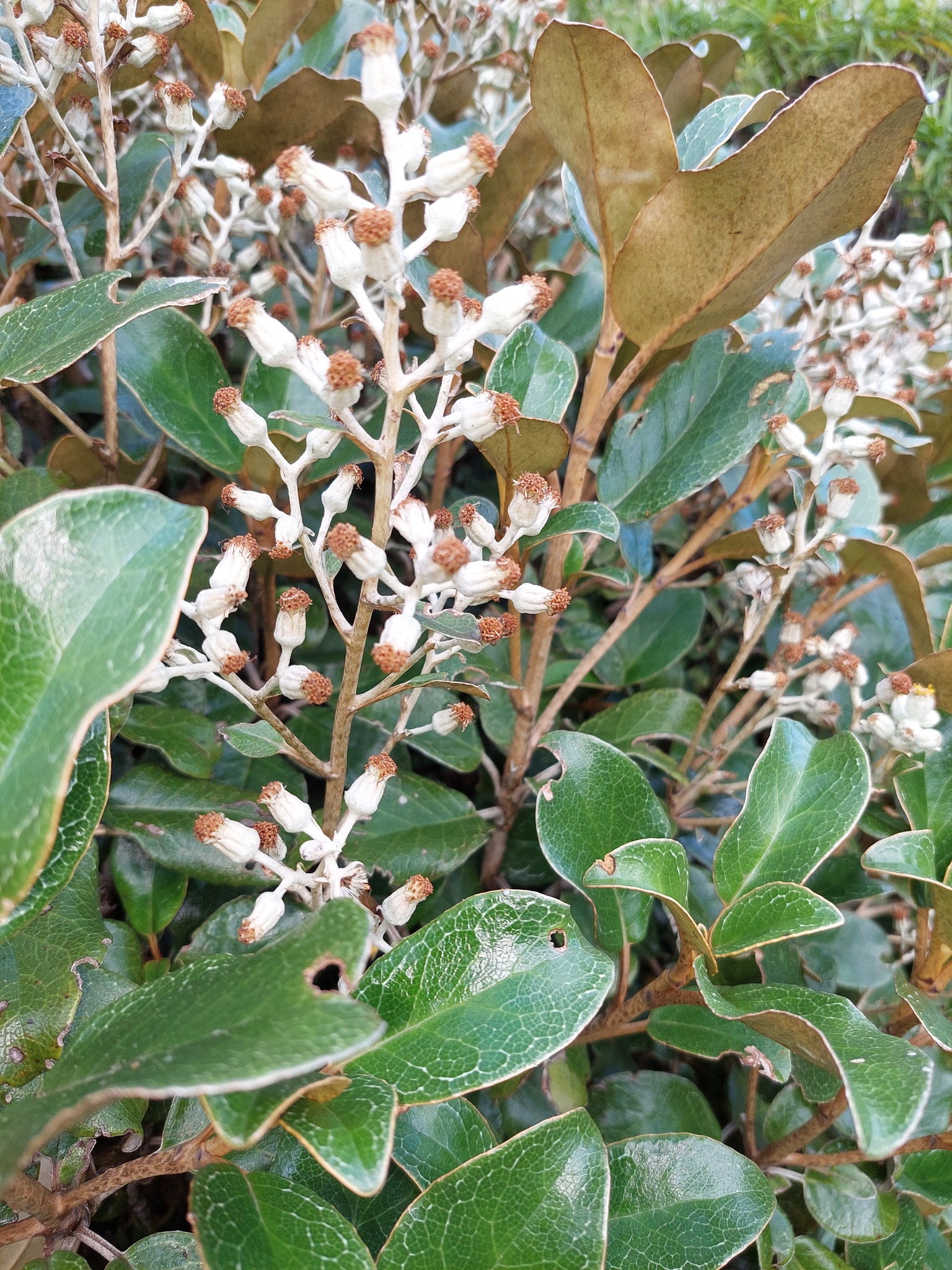
Likely larval host plant B. elaeagnifolia.

The likely larval host plant of this species is Brachyglottis elaeagnifolia, as adults have been swept from this plant. The larvae mine the leaves of their host plant.
