= Daisy bush =

Daisy bush can be:

- Species of the genus Olearia
- The New Zealand native Brachyglottis greyi
- Gamolepis chrysanthemoides also known as African bush daisy
