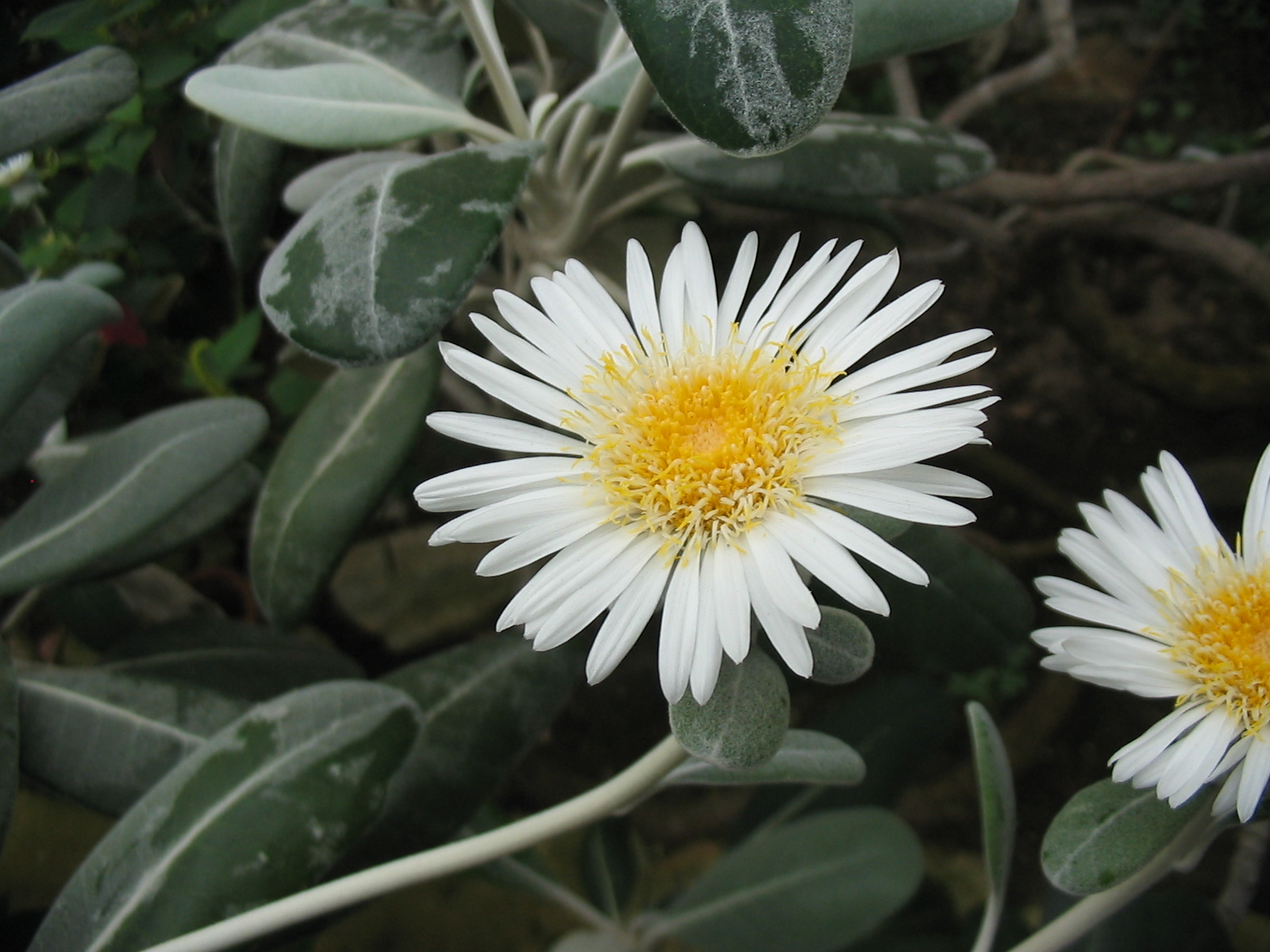
- Pachystegia insignis

Scientific classification
- Kingdom: Plantae
- Clade: Tracheophytes
- Clade: Angiosperms
- Clade: Eudicots
- Clade: Asterids
- Order: Asterales
- Family: Asteraceae
- Subfamily: Asteroideae
- Tribe: Astereae
- Subtribe: Celmisiinae
- Genus: Pachystegia; Cheeseman, 1925

= Pachystegia =

Marlborough rock daisies

Genus of shrubs

Pachystegia is a genus of shrubs in the family Asteraceae, known as Marlborough rock daisies, with distinctive leathery leaves and daisy-like flowers. They are naturally found only in dry areas of the north-eastern South Island of New Zealand.

== Taxonomy ==
Pachystegia was first described by Joseph Hooker in 1855 from specimens collected along the banks of the Waihopai River, Marlborough. Hooker placed it in the tree daisy genus Olearia, naming it Olearia insignis. In 1915 Thomas Cheeseman named a smaller variety O. insignis var. minor; eventually he decided the species was sufficiently different from tree daisies to warrant its own genus, Pachystegia, meaning “thickly covered”, referring to the dense hairs on the undersides of its leaves. Later field study and analysis of flavonoids suggested there were at least six taxonomic entities in Pachystegia. P. minor was elevated to species status, and P. rufa named, but several species remain undescribed.

=== Described species ===
- Pachystegia insignis (Hook.f.) Cheeseman
- Pachystegia minor (Cheeseman) Molloy
- Pachystegia rufa Molloy
- Pachystegia hesperia Heenan & Molloy

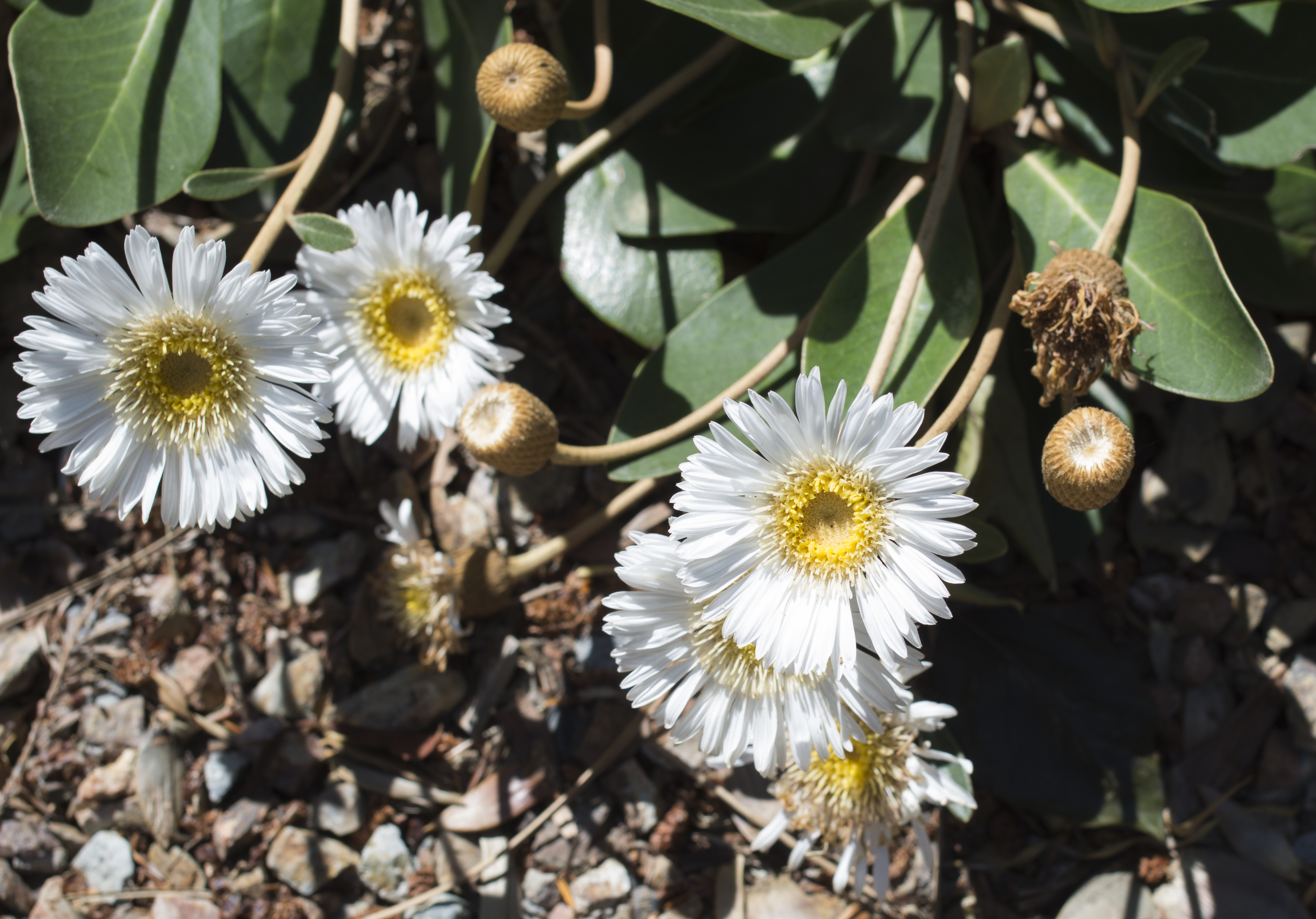
Pachystegia rufa

== Description ==
Pachystegia is adapted to drought, and grows on dry inland hills and coastal cliffs – it is often restricted to inaccessible rocky bluffs and cliffs, out of the reach of introduced sheep, goats, and rabbits. It often occurs with the other drought-tolerant shrubs Veronica hulkeana and Brachyglottis monroi. All species are low spreading shrubs with leaves that are thick and leathery and white-furred below. Their white daisy flowers have distinctive large buds covered with overlapping scales. Hybridisation between described and undescribed species is common; some hybrid cultivars of P. insignis and P. minor are popular around the world as garden plants.

== Distribution ==
The entire genus is endemic to Marlborough and North Canterbury in the South Island of New Zealand. Pachystegisa insignis is widespread, found from the Wairau River in the north to the Waiau Uwha River in Canterbury. P. rufa and P. minor have much smaller ranges, and the latter is considered a threatened species. Pachystegia species are often found on the coast, but they occur as far inland as Molesworth Station and the Upper Awatere River valley. The most endangered is the Ōhau rock daisy, an undescribed species found only on Ōhau Point north of Kaikōura.
