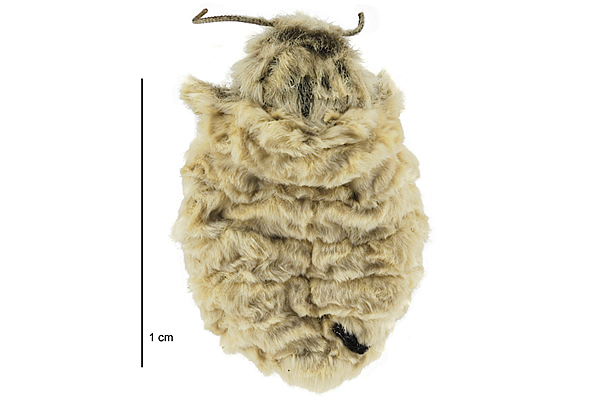
- Female Metacrias huttoni
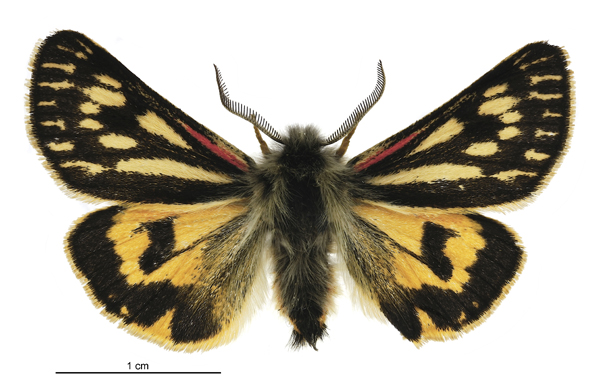
- Male Metacrias huttoni

Scientific classification
- Kingdom: Animalia
- Phylum: Arthropoda
- Class: Insecta
- Order: Lepidoptera
- Superfamily: Noctuoidea
- Family: Erebidae
- Subfamily: Arctiinae
- Subtribe: Spilosomina
- Genus: Metacrias; Meyrick, 1887

Type species
- Metacrias erichrysa Meyrick, 1887
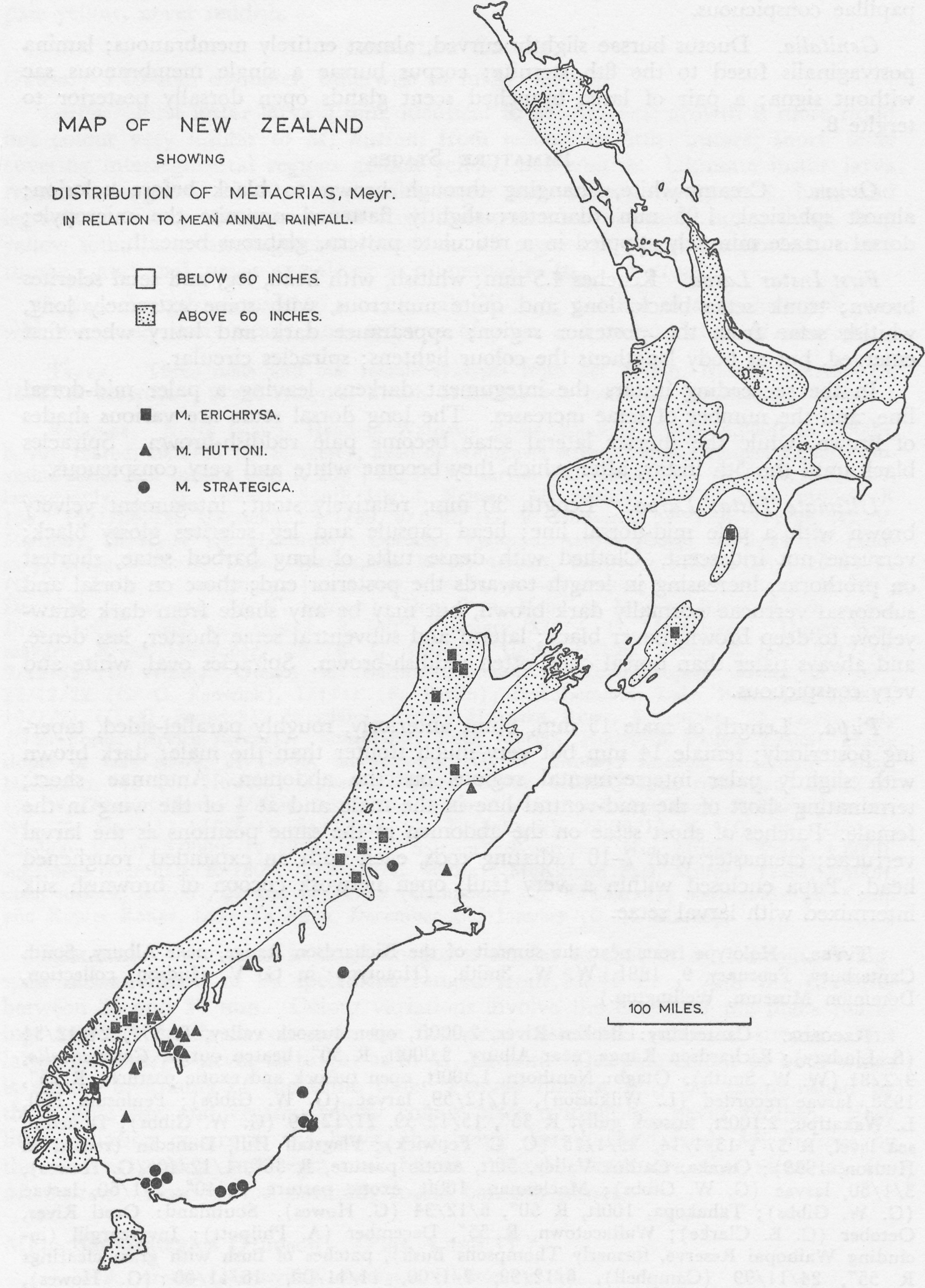

= Metacrias =

Genus of moths

Metacrias is a genus of moths in the family Erebidae. All species are endemic to New Zealand.

== Taxonomy ==
Metacrias was first described by Edward Meyrick in a paper in the journal Proceedings of the Linnean Society of New South Wales published in 1887. It has been postulated that this genus may be cogeneric with Phaos, an Australian genus.

== Species ==
- Metacrias erichrysa Meyrick, 1886
- Metacrias huttoni Butler, 1879
- Metacrias strategica (Hudson, 1889)
