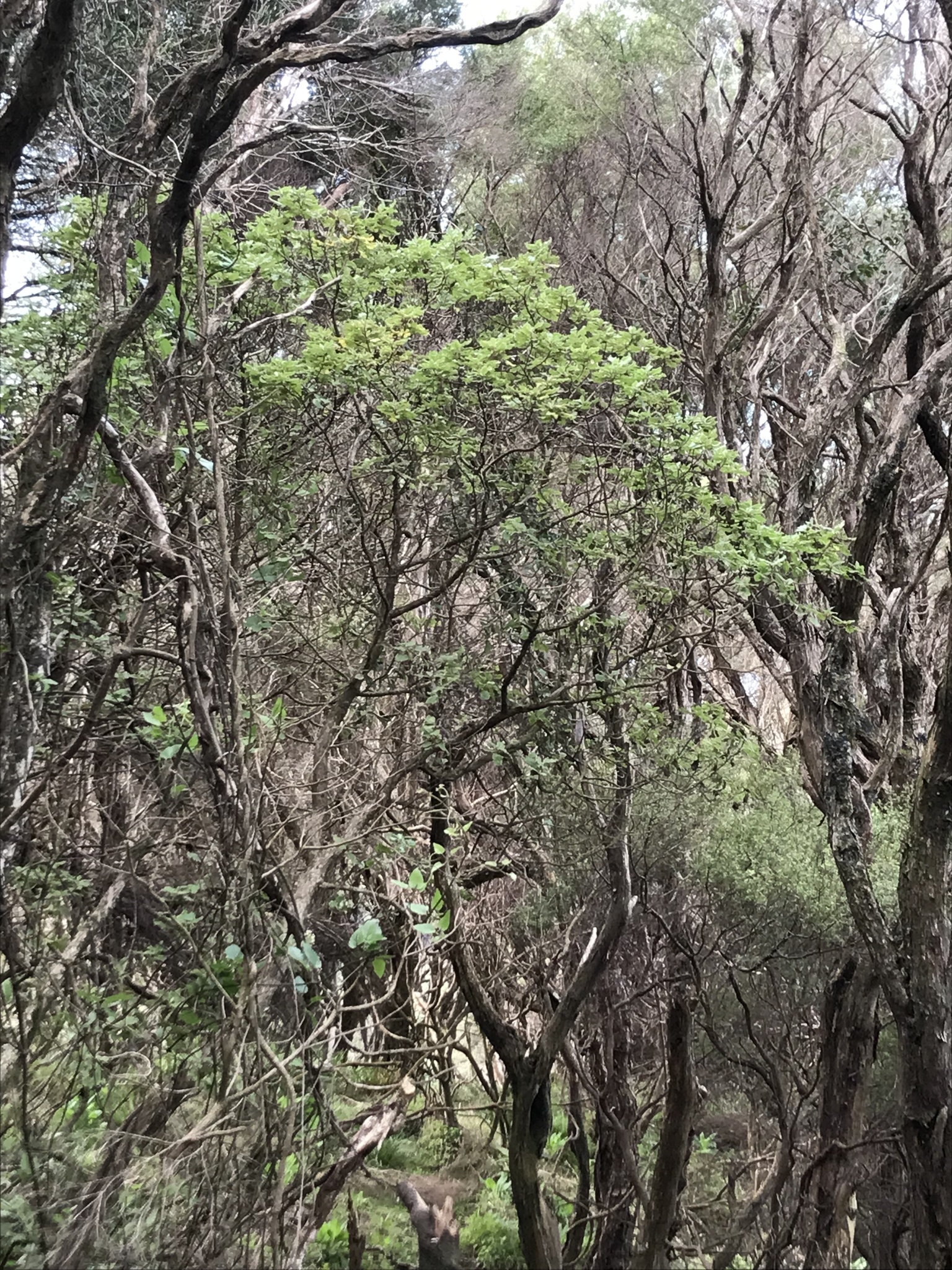

Conservation status
- Critically Endangered (IUCN 3.1)

- Nationally Critical (NZ TCS)

Scientific classification
- Kingdom: Plantae
- Clade: Tracheophytes
- Clade: Angiosperms
- Clade: Eudicots
- Clade: Asterids
- Order: Asterales
- Family: Asteraceae
- Genus: Brachyglottis
- Species: B. pentacopa

Binomial name
- Brachyglottis pentacopa (Drury) B.Nordenstam

= Brachyglottis pentacopa =

Species of flowering plant

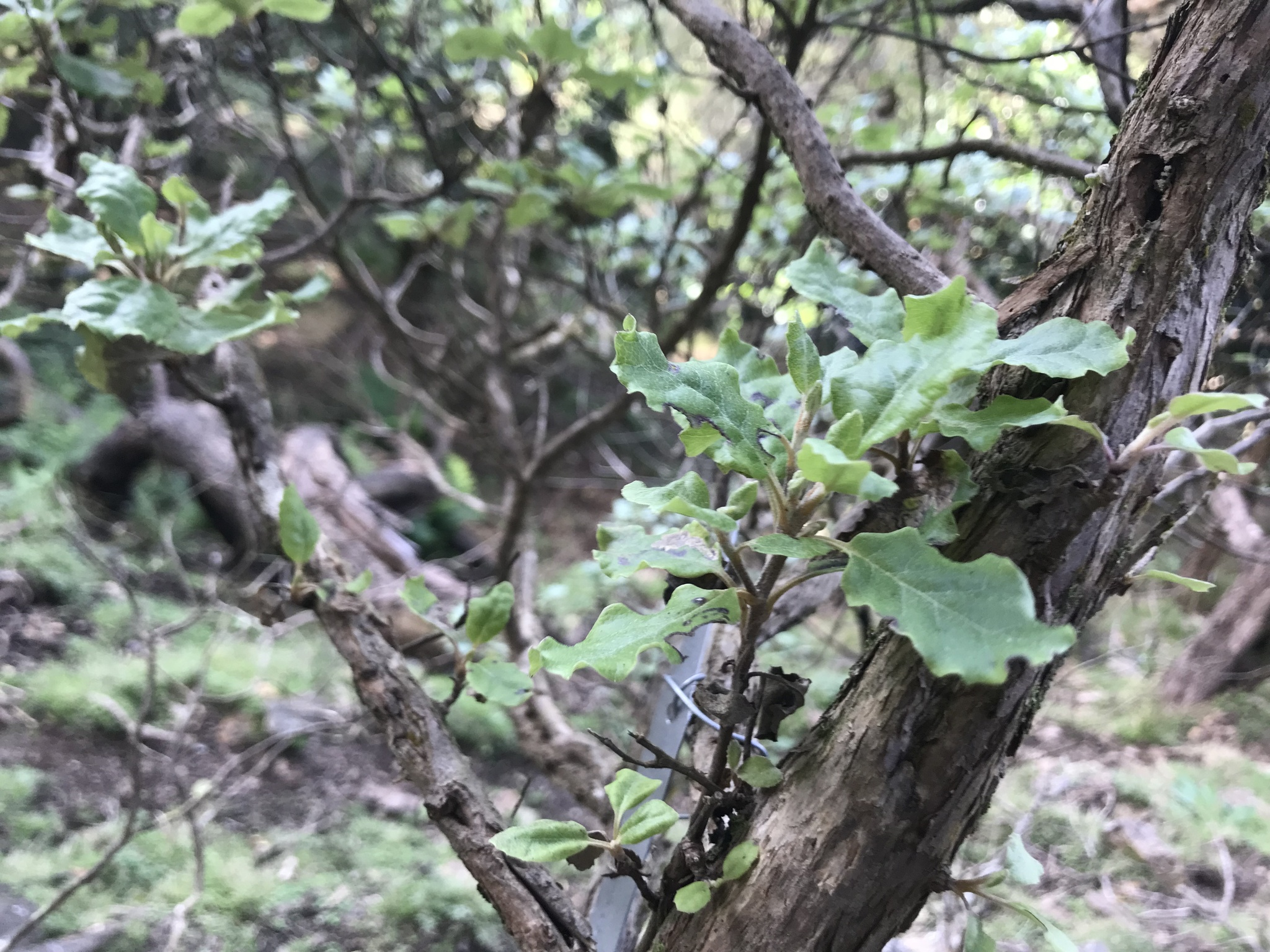
Leaves of Brachyglottis pentacopa

Brachyglottis pentacopa is a species of flowering plant in the family Asteraceae. It is found only in New Zealand.

== Taxonomy ==
The species was originally described as Senecio pentacopus by New Zealand botanist David Geoffrey Drury in 1973. It was later transferred to the genus Brachyglottis by Bertil Nordenstam in 1978. The type specimen was collected by New Zealand botanist Anthony Peter Druce in open forest at Mount Percy, in eastern Wairarapa, North Island, New Zealand in December 1966. The holotype specimen is housed at the Allan Herbarium (CHR 179366).

Leaves with cottony hairs on the underside

Brachyglottis pentacopa is morphologically most similar to B. perdicioides, another forest species. It can be distinguished from that species vegetatively by its elliptic, broadly elliptic or rarely broadly oblong-elliptic leaves with cottony hairs on the underside, compared to oblong to elliptic-oblong leaves that are green underneath in B. perdicioides. In addition, the reproductive characters that distinguish B. pentacopa from B. perdicioides include the number of its phyllaries (8), female flowers (4 to 8), and hermaphroditic flowers (7 to 9).

== Distribution ==
The species endemic to the North Island of New Zealand and only known from a single location, Mt Percy.

== Conservation status ==
Brachyglottis pentacopa is listed as Threatened - Nationally Critical with the qualifier OL ("one location") in the latest New Zealand threat classification assessment (2023). The species, together with other North Island lowland species, has been negatively affected by introduced ungulate browsing.
