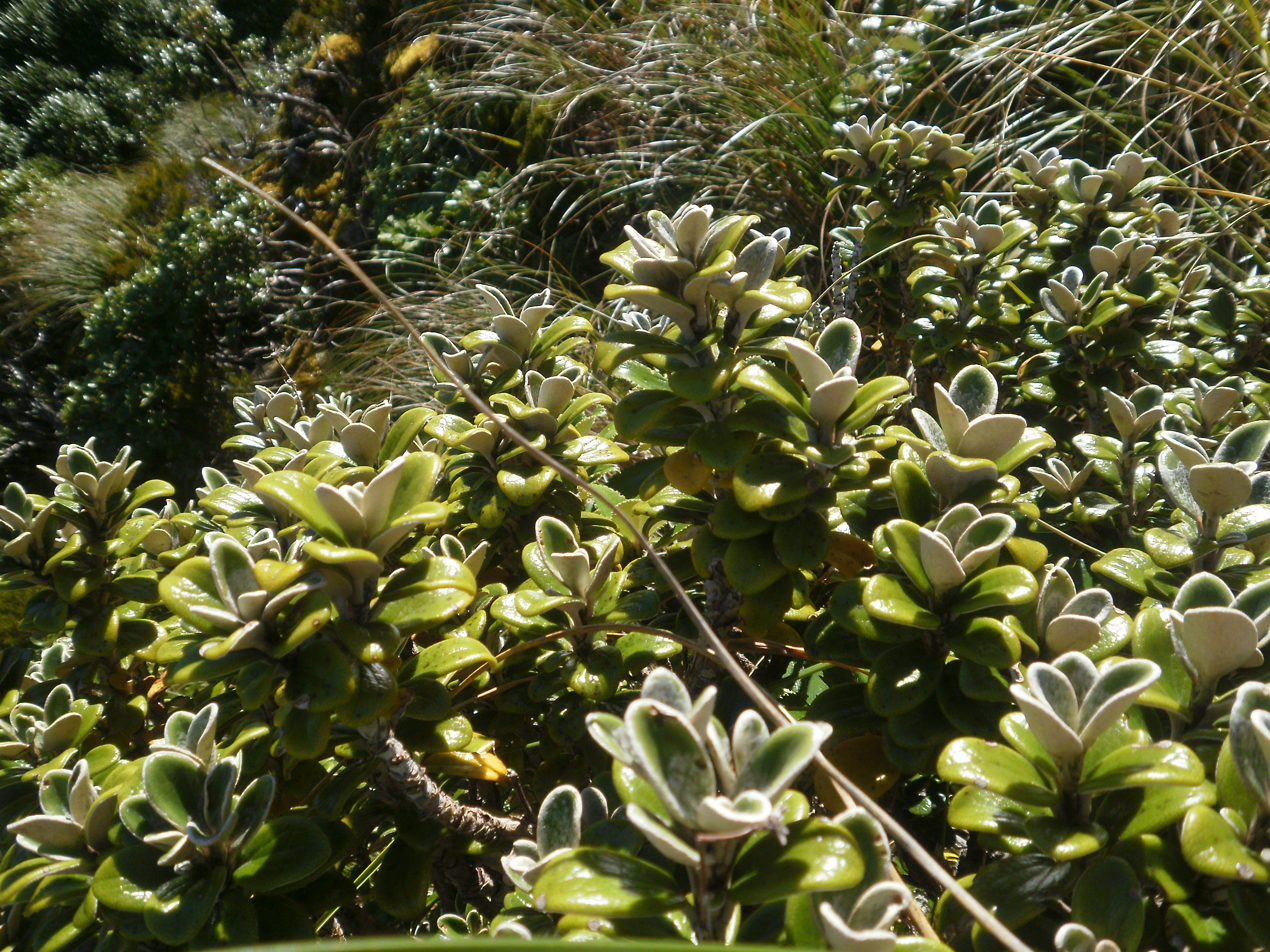

Scientific classification
- Kingdom: Plantae
- Clade: Tracheophytes
- Clade: Angiosperms
- Clade: Eudicots
- Clade: Asterids
- Order: Asterales
- Family: Asteraceae
- Genus: Brachyglottis
- Species: B. bidwillii

Binomial name
- Brachyglottis bidwillii (Hook.f.) B.Nord.

Synonyms
- Senecio bidwillii

= Brachyglottis bidwillii =

Species of flowering plant

Brachyglottis bidwillii is a species of flowering plant in the family Asteraceae. It is endemic to New Zealand.

== Description ==
It is a shrub growing up to a meter tall. The branches are thick and the smaller branches and petioles are covered in whitish or pale brownish hairs. The leathery oval leaves are up to 2.5 centimeters long. They are shiny and hairless on the upper surfaces and woolly-haired on the undersides. The inflorescence is a panicle of bell-shaped flower heads containing disc florets. The fruit is an achene up to 8 millimeters long including its pappus of barbed white hairs.

== Distribution and habitat ==
The shrub is a dominant species in the scrub habitat of the mountain ranges surrounding Nelson on the northern South Island. It also grows in open grassland in Arthur's Pass National Park.
