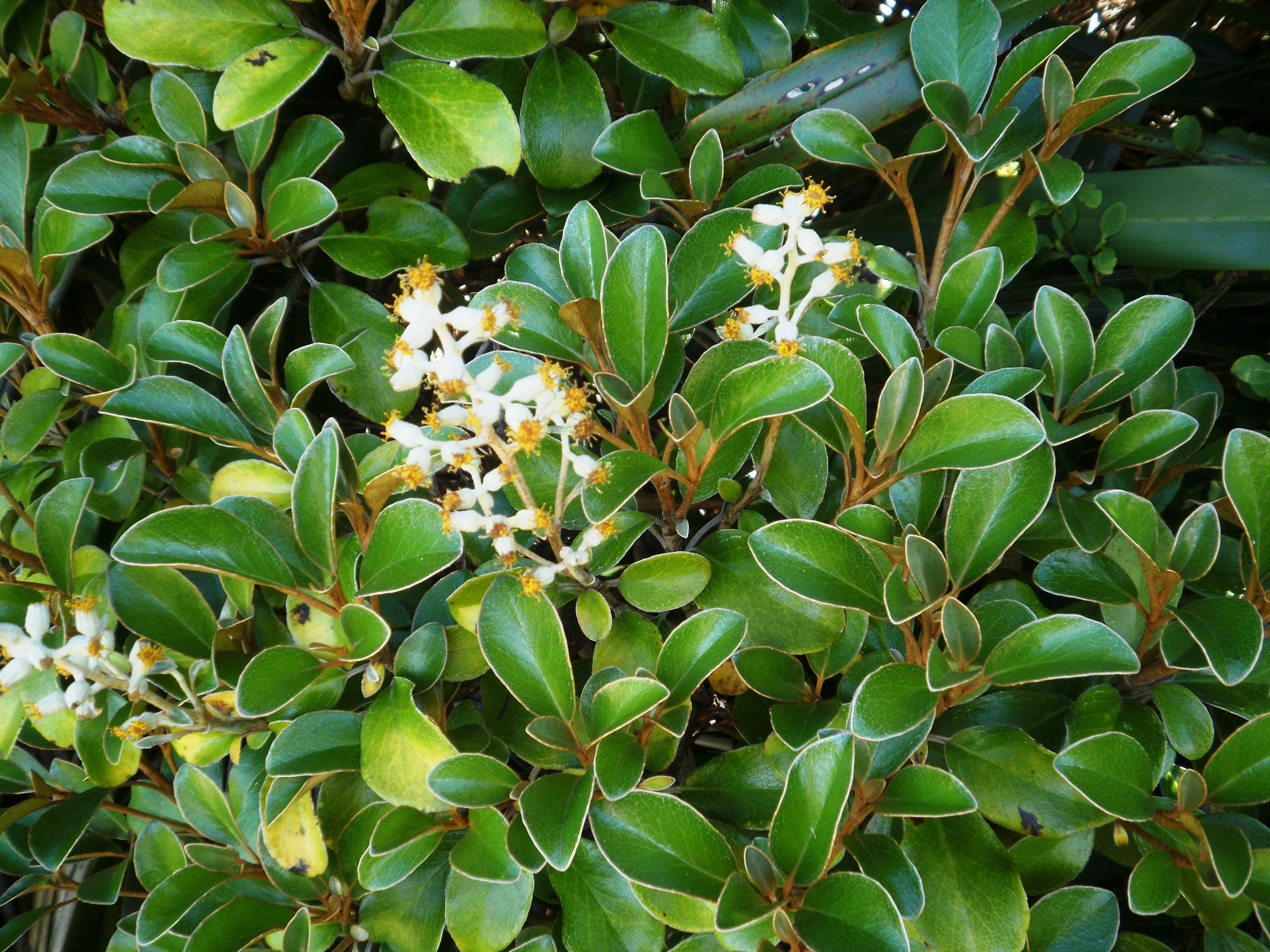
- Brachyglottis elaeagnifolia

Scientific classification
- Kingdom: Plantae
- Clade: Tracheophytes
- Clade: Angiosperms
- Clade: Eudicots
- Clade: Asterids
- Order: Asterales
- Family: Asteraceae
- Subfamily: Asteroideae
- Tribe: Senecioneae
- Genus: Brachyglottis; J.R.Forst. & G.Forst.

Species
- About 39

Synonyms
- Urostemon B.Nord.

= Brachyglottis =

Genus of flowering plants

Brachyglottis is a genus of flowering plants in the family Asteraceae. The genus was erected on November 29, 1775, by Johann Reinhold Forster and Georg Forster. The name was derived from the Greek brachus ("short") and glottis ("the vocal apparatus of the larynx") a reference to the size of the ray florets.

The genus is almost entirely native to New Zealand, except for B. brunonis, which occurs in Tasmania.

In cultivation in the UK, the cultivar 'Sunshine' has received the Royal Horticultural Society's Award of Garden Merit.

== Etymology ==
Brachyglottis comes from the two greek words: Brachus, meaning short, and glottis which is the vocal apparatus of the larynx.

== Diversity ==
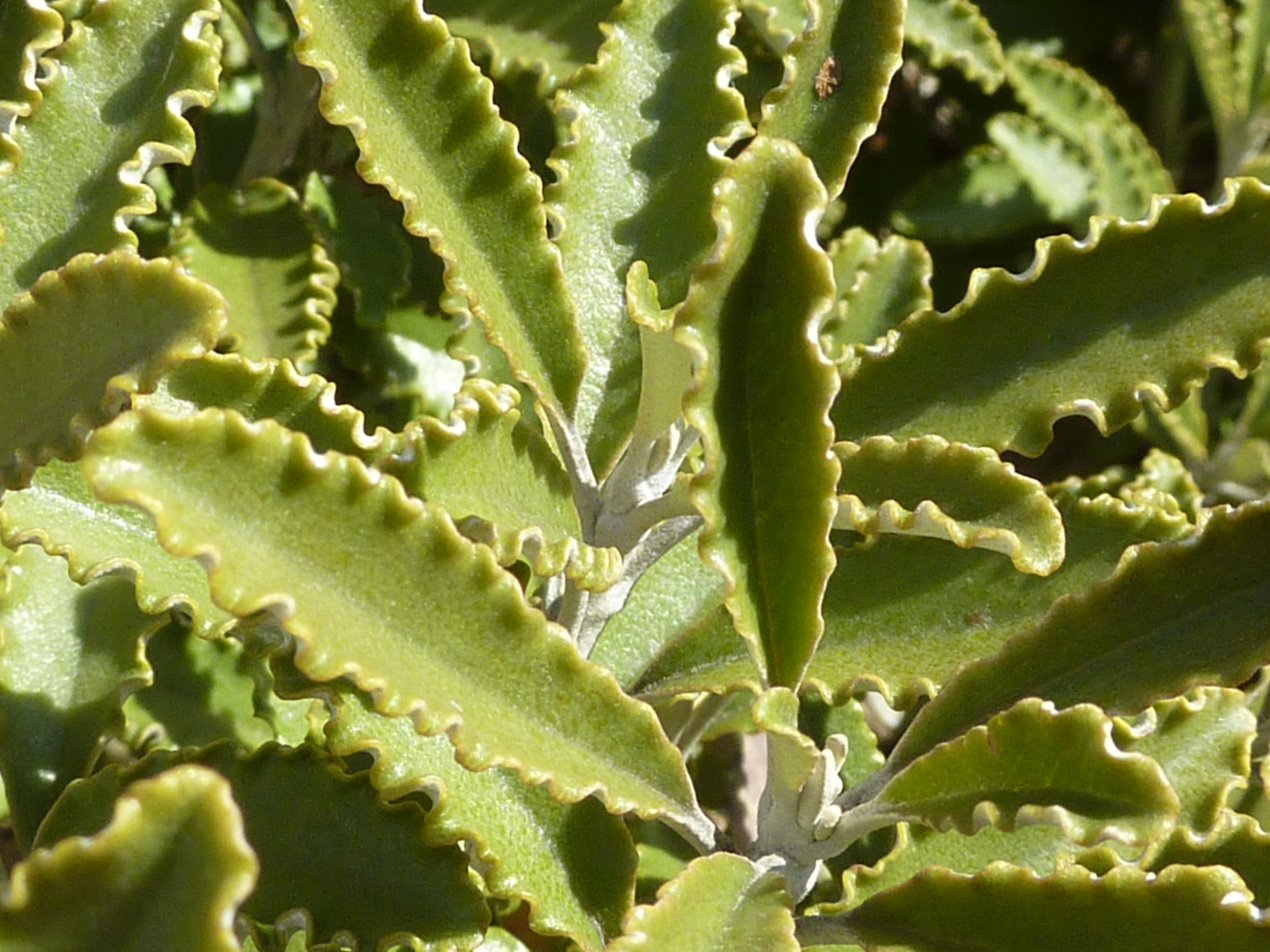
Brachyglottis monroi

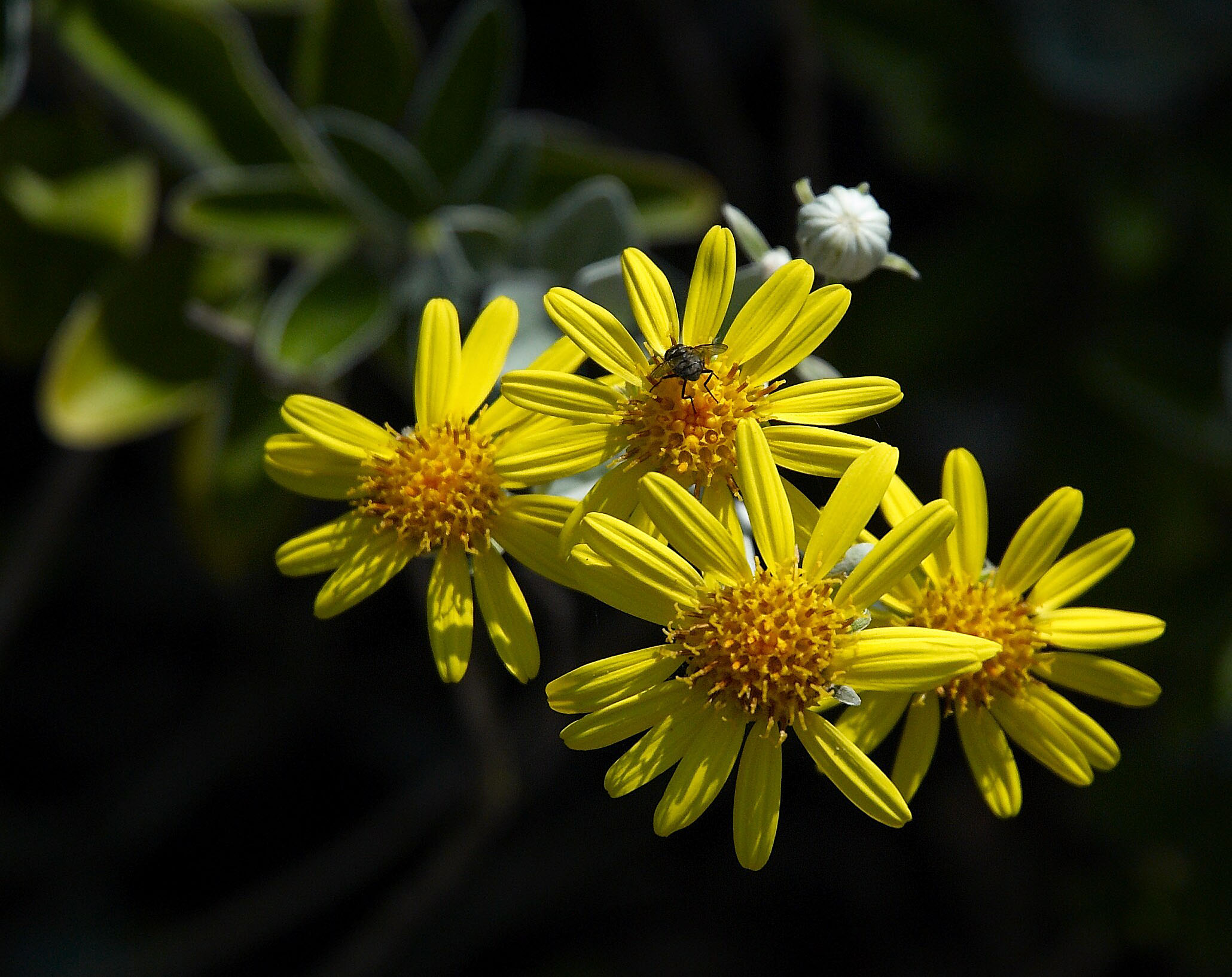
Brachyglottis 'Sunshine'

There are about 39 accepted species names. Most species were transferred to the genus from Senecio in 1977 and 1978.

Species include:

- Brachyglottis adamsii
- Brachyglottis arborescens – Three Kings rangiora
- Brachyglottis bellidioides
- Brachyglottis bidwillii
- Brachyglottis bifistulosa
- Brachyglottis brunonis
- Brachyglottis buchananii
- Brachyglottis caledoniae
- Brachyglottis cassinioides
- Brachyglottis christensenii
- Brachyglottis cockaynei
- Brachyglottis compacta (Kirk) B.Nord. – Wairarapa groundsel, piecrust plant
  - Senecio compactus Kirk
- Brachyglottis elaeagnifolia (Hook. f.) B.Nord.
  - Senecio elaeagnifolius Hook. f.
- Brachyglottis forsteri
- Brachyglottis greyi (Hook. f.) B.Nord.
  - Senecio greyi Hook. f.
- Brachyglottis haastii
- Brachyglottis hectorii
- Brachyglottis huntii (F.Muell.) B.Nord.
  - Senecio huntii F.Muell.
- Brachyglottis lagopus (Raoul) B.Nord.
  - Senecio lagopus
- Brachyglottis lapidosa
- Brachyglottis laxifolia (Buchanan) B.Nord.
  - Senecio laxifolius Buchanan
- Brachyglottis matthewsii
- Brachyglottis monroi (Hook. f.) B.Nord. – Monro's ragwort
  - Senecio monroi Hook. f.
- Brachyglottis myrianthos
- Brachyglottis orbiculatus
- Brachyglottis pentacopa
- Brachyglottis perdicioides (Hook. f.) B.Nord.
  - Senecio perdicioides Hook. f.
- Brachyglottis remotifolia
- Brachyglottis repanda J.R.Forst. & G.Forst. – rangiora, pukapuka, hedge ragwort
- Brachyglottis revoluta
- Brachyglottis rotundifolia – muttonbird scrub
- Brachyglottis saxifragoides (Hook. f.) B.Nord.
  - Senecio saxifragoides Hook. f.
- Brachyglottis sciadophila
- Brachyglottis southlandica
- Brachyglottis spedenii
- Brachyglottis stewartiae (J.B.Armstr.) B.Nord.
  - Senecio muelleri Kirk
  - Senecio stewartiae J.B.Armstr.
- Brachyglottis traversii (F.Muell.) B.Nord.
- Brachyglottis turneri
