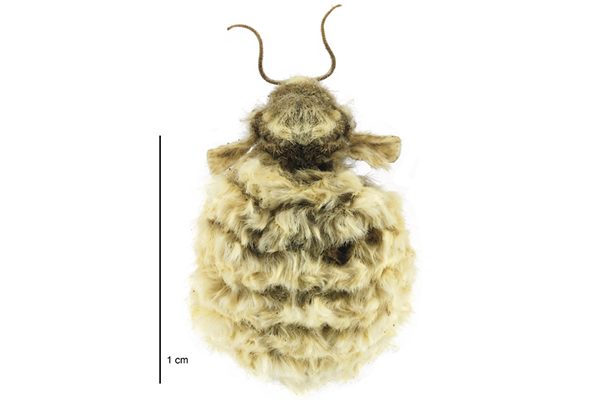
- Female
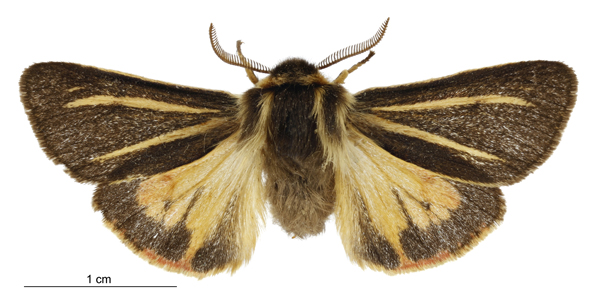
- Male

Scientific classification
- Kingdom: Animalia
- Phylum: Arthropoda
- Clade: Pancrustacea
- Class: Insecta
- Order: Lepidoptera
- Superfamily: Noctuoidea
- Family: Erebidae
- Subfamily: Arctiinae
- Genus: Metacrias
- Species: M. strategica

Binomial name
- Metacrias strategica (Hudson, 1889)

Synonyms
- Arctia strategica Hudson, 1889; Metacrias strategica hudsoni Rothschild, 1914

= Metacrias strategica =

Species of moth

Metacrias strategica is a species of moth in the family Erebidae. This species is endemic to New Zealand where it is known from the southern part of the South Island. The female of the species is flightless and pale brown, grey or yellowish-brown in colour where as the male is brightly coloured and flies during the day.

== Taxonomy ==
This species was first described by George Hudson in 1889 using specimens obtained from William Walter Smith and named Arctia strategica. Smith took the holotype specimen in February near the summit of the Richardson Range in South Canterbury by beating Carmichaelia australis. George Hudson discussed and illustrated this species in his 1898 publication New Zealand moths and butterflies (Macro-lepidoptera), and again in his 1928 book The Butterflies and Moths of New Zealand. In both those publications he used the name Metacrias strategica, following the assignment of the species to that genus by Edward Meyrick in 1890. In 1914 Charles Rothschild proposed the subspecies Metacrias strategica hudsoni, however this was synonymised by John S. Dugdale in 1988. The holotype specimen is held at the Museum of New Zealand Te Papa Tongarewa.

== Description ==
Adults males are brightly coloured and diurnal, while females are pale brown, grey or yellowish-brown in colour.

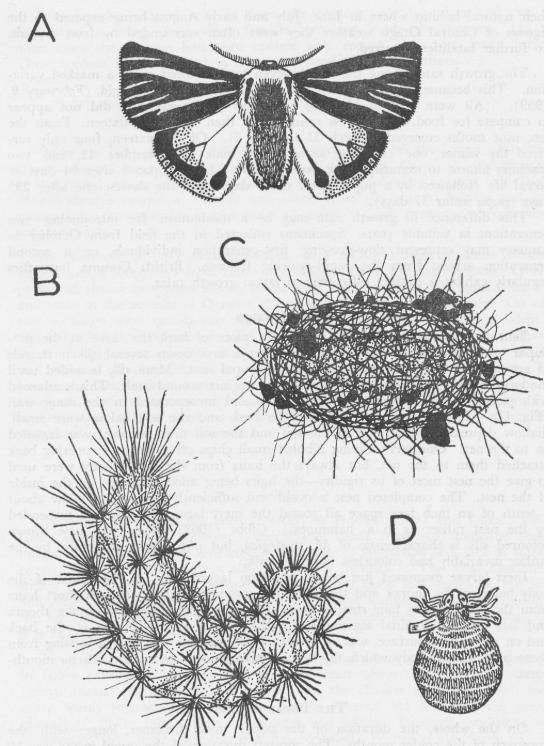
Metacrias strategica – life stages. A. Male. B. Larva C. Cocoon with pupa D. Female

Hudson described the species as follows:

♂︎ . Expanse of wings 17 lines. Antennae dull yellow, with articulations marked in black. Head black, with a small tuft of ochreous scales in front. Legs ochreous, striped longitudinally with black. Thorax black, the margin of the prothorax indicated by a yellowish collar; mesothorax with a very broad yellow stripe on each side. Forewings, with costa, nearly straight, black, with six longitudinal ochreous lines; the first almost imperceptible, extending interruptedly only about one-sixth from hindmargin towards base; the second traversing the whole of the wing uninterrupted throughout, and broadest on disc, slightly curved downwards towards hind margin; the third much broken, and terminating at about one quarter from hind margin; also the fourth and fifth, which are, however, a little longer; the sixth very broad, extending from hind margin to base of the wing. Costa and inner margin edged with ochreous. Hindwings with a broad sub-marginal band of black, terminating shortly before anal angle, a large black dot being situated in the anal angle, yellowish ochre, tinged with red in the vicinity of the black band. Hind margin brilliant crimson, except at anterior angle, where black band extends to the edge of the wing; cilia of both wings ochreous. Abdomen black, with long ochreous hairs. Beneath, all the wings are yellowish ochre, with their margins broadly edged with black, and tinged with red near the edges. A conspicuous reddish stripe in the disc of each wing, and also a minute discal dot, which is quite invisible on the upper surface. Female unknown, but probably apterous.

== Distribution ==
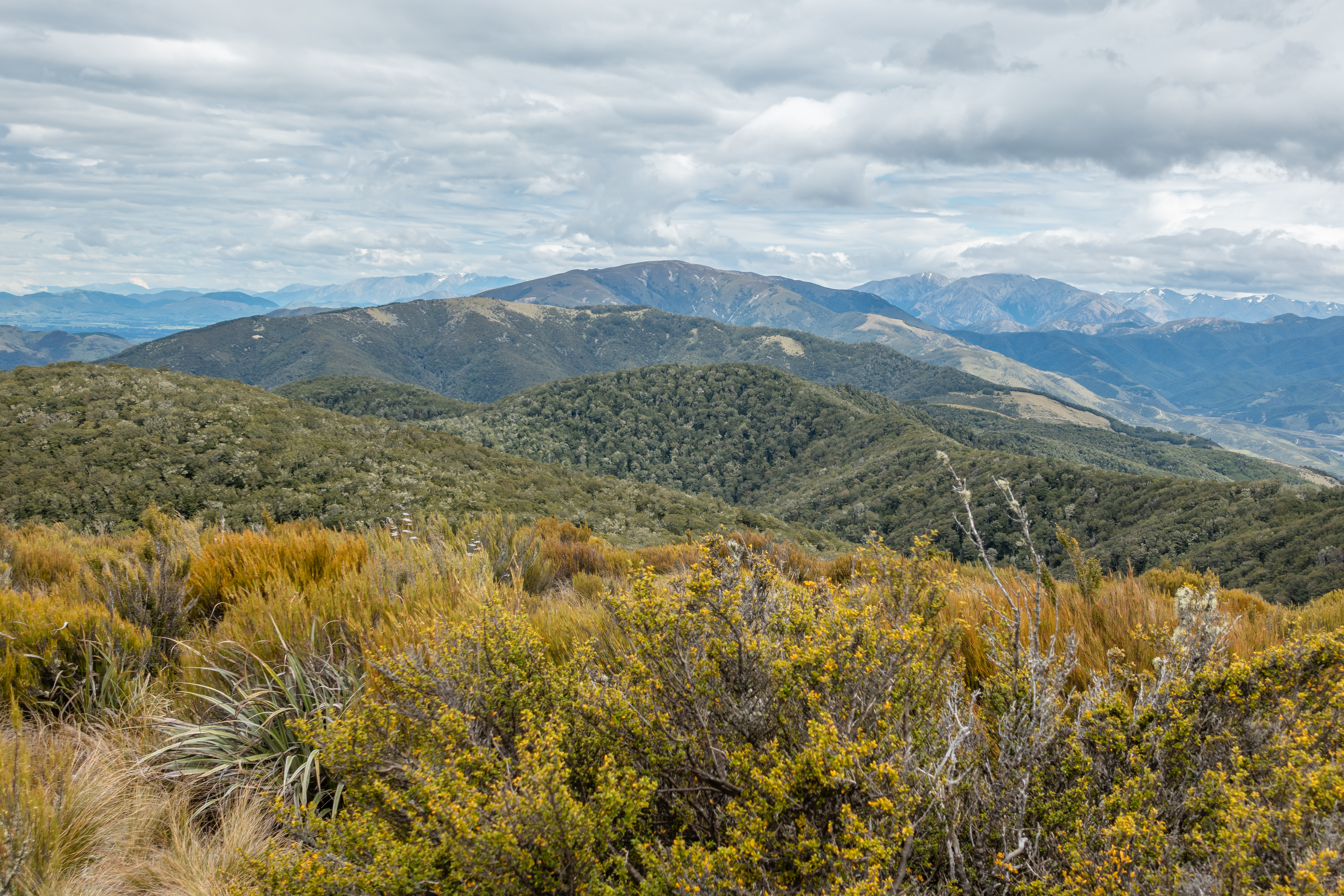
Habitat at Mount Richardson, Canterbury

M. strategica is endemic to New Zealand. It is known from the southern part of the South Island. It has been recorded in Otatara and at Waituna where it inhabits coastal silver tussock patches at the back of the shingle beach. Other sites in Southland include Brydone, Cannibal Bay, Waipapa Point and Sandy Point.

== Biology and behaviour ==
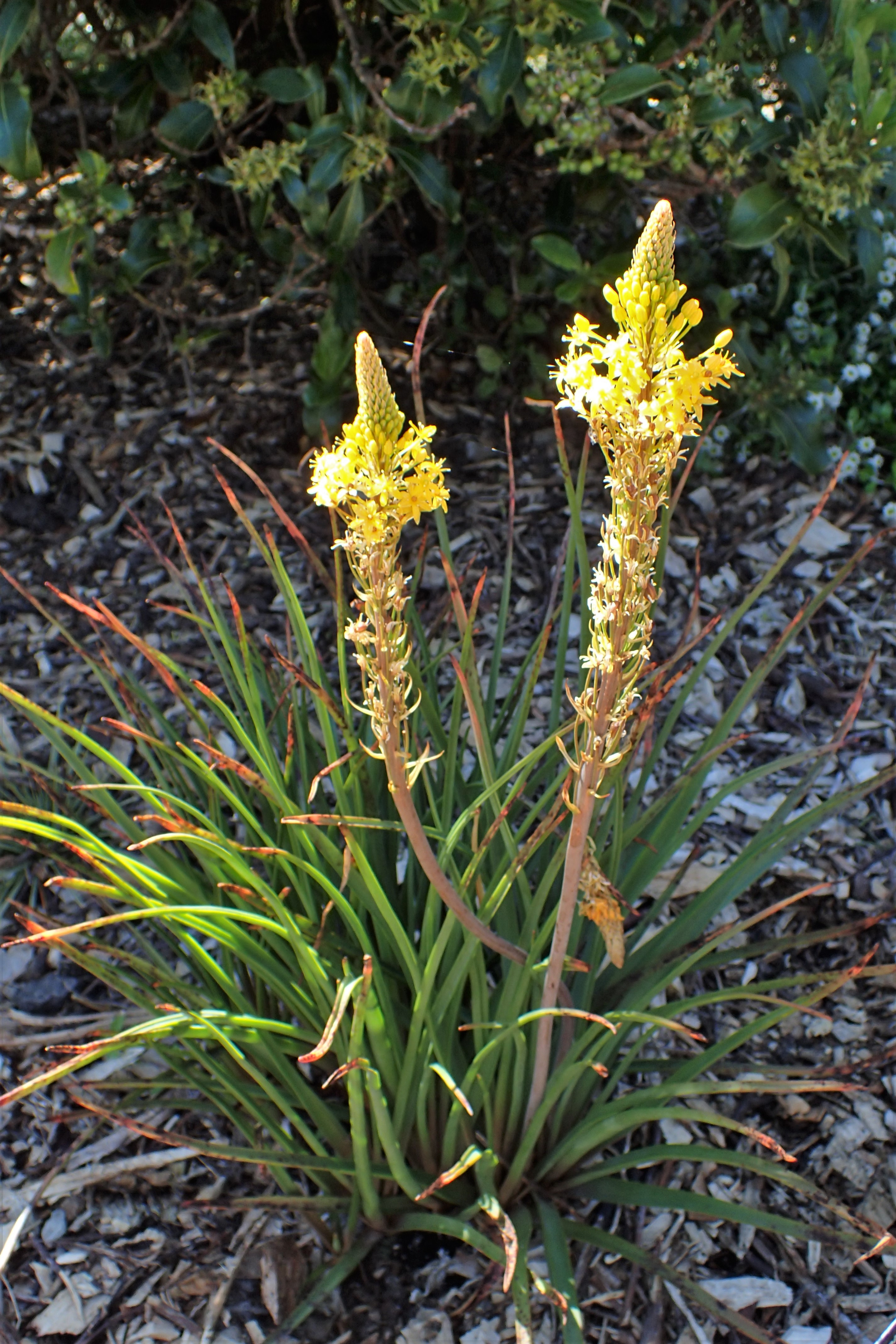
Bulbinella hookeri - a host plant

The larvae are polyphagous on grasses and herbs.

Although the females are flightless and tend to stay in their cocoon to bred and lay eggs, some females, after they pupate, have been shown to leave and move a short distance from their nest. However main population disbursal is as a result of larvae movement.

== Habitat and host species ==
This species is found in coastal and forest-edge sites up to the montane zone. The larvae have been observed feeding on European grasses, clover, species in the genera Acaena and Crepis, dandelion, plantain, and the endemic species Bulbinella hookeri. Other species consumed by the larvae include Gentiana bellidifolia, Senecio bellidioides, and Muehlenbeckia complexia.
