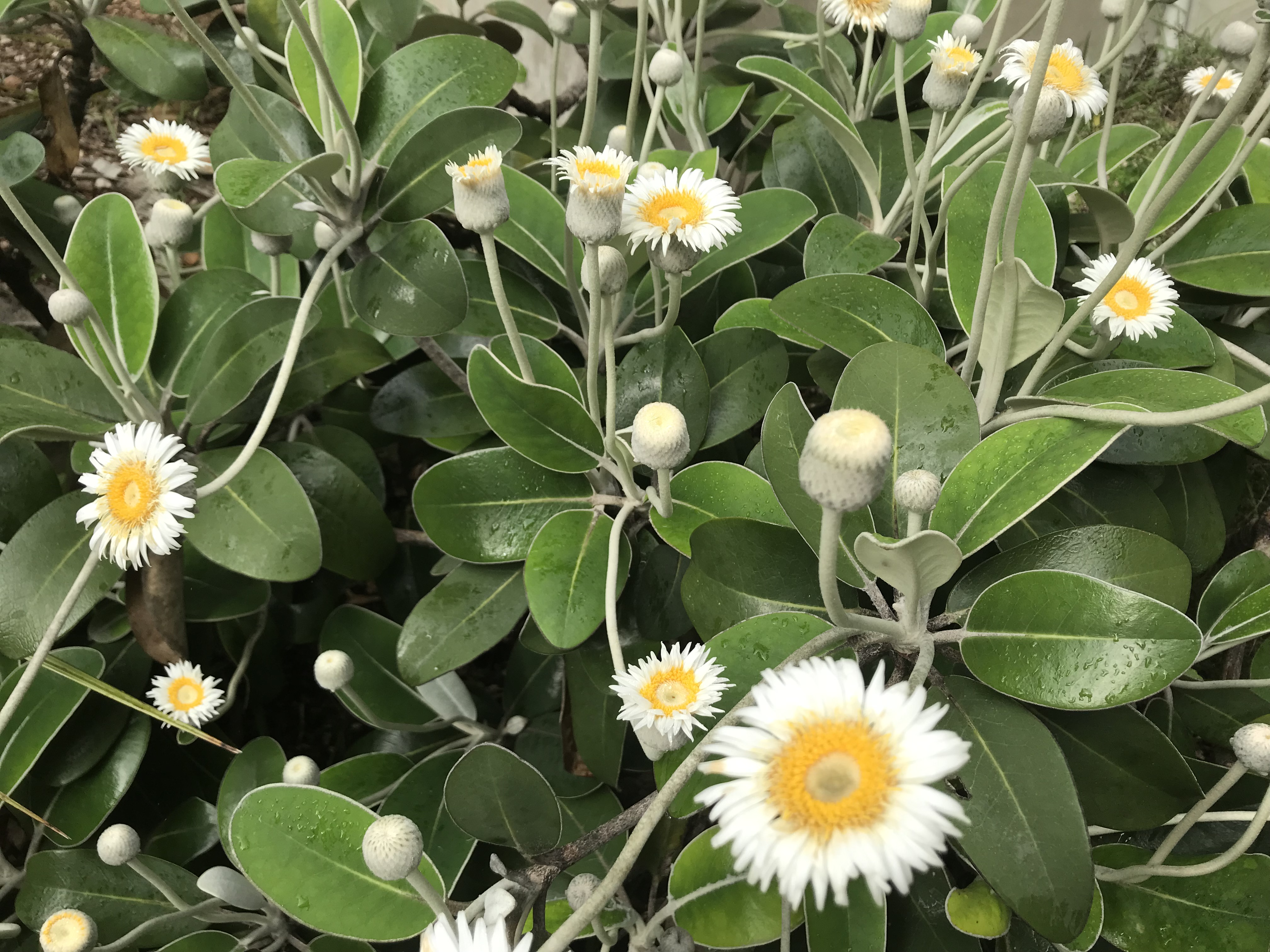

Scientific classification
- Kingdom: Plantae
- Clade: Tracheophytes
- Clade: Angiosperms
- Clade: Eudicots
- Clade: Asterids
- Order: Asterales
- Family: Asteraceae
- Genus: Pachystegia
- Species: P. insignis

Binomial name
- Pachystegia insignis (Hook.f.) Cheeseman, 1925

= Pachystegia insignis =

Species of flowering plant

Pachystegia insignis is a species of flowering plants in the family Asteraceae. It is endemic to New Zealand.

== Taxonomy ==
The species was first described by Joseph Dalton Hooker in 1855, who named the species Olearia insignis. It was recognised as a member of the genus Pachystegia by Thomas Frederic Cheeseman, whose description was posthumously published in the Manual of the New Zealand Flora (second edition) in 1925.

== Description ==
Cheeseman described the species as follows:

A low robust spreading shrub 1–6 ft. high, rarely more; branches stout, densely tomentose. Leaves crowded at the ends of the branches, 3–7 in. long, 1–4 in. broad, oblong or oblong-ovate or narrow-obovate, obtuse, equal or unequal at the base, quite entire, excessively thick and coriaceous, glabrous and shining above, under-surface thickly clothed with white appressed tomentum, becoming fulvous or red when dry, veins evident on both surfaces; petiole 4-2in. long, stout. Peduncles 1–5 at the ends of the branches, 4–12 in. long, stout, evenly tomentose, naked or with a few foliaceous bracts immediately below the head. Head large, hemispherical, 2-3in. diam.; involucral scales imbricated in many series, tomentose. Ray-florets very numerous; ligules narrow, white. Disc-florets yellow. Pappus of one series of equal scabrid hairs thickened at the tips. Achenes long and slender, silky.
