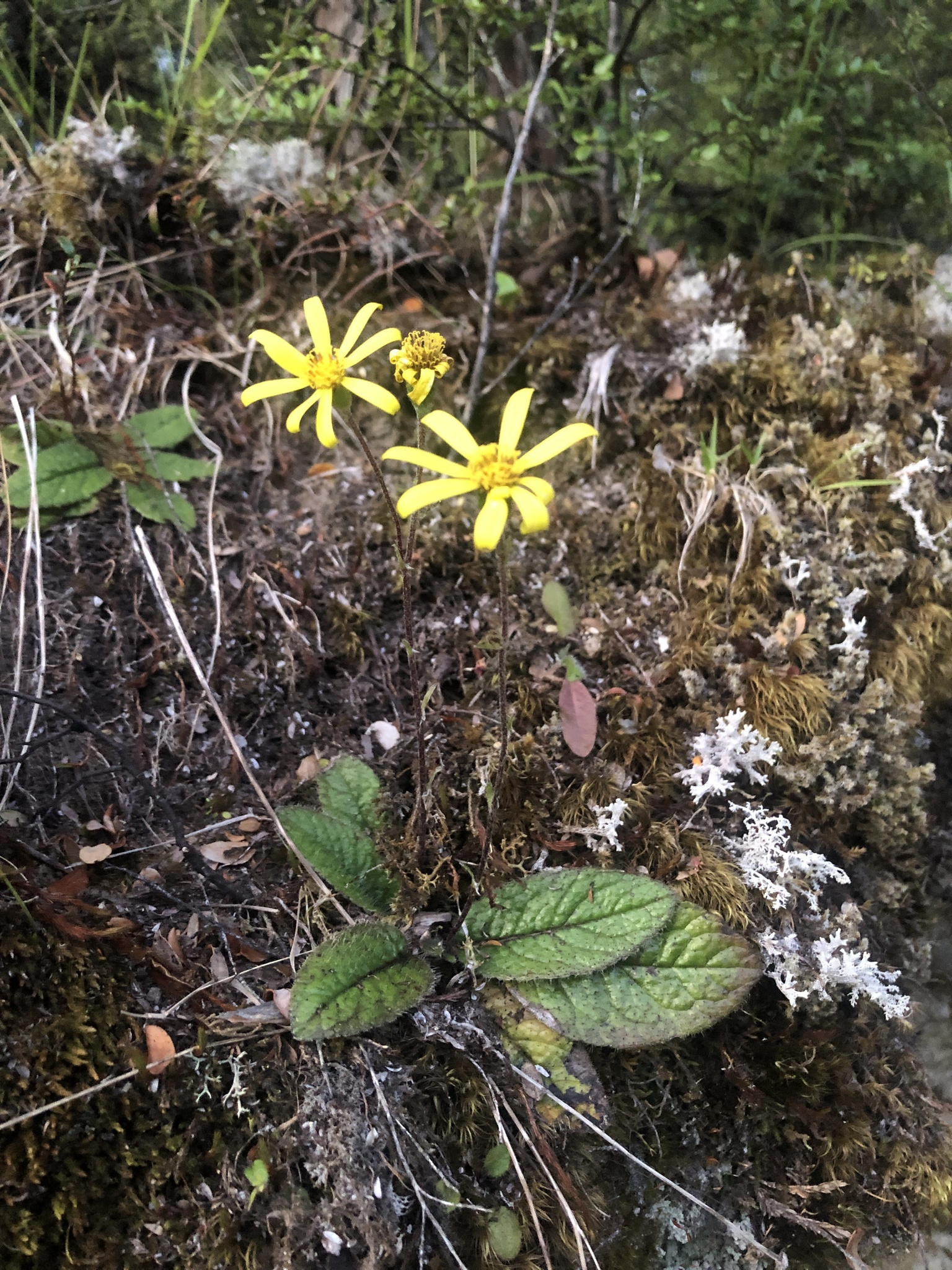
- Brachyglottis bellidioides in Nelson Lakes National Park

Conservation status
- Not Threatened (NZ TCS)

Scientific classification
- Kingdom: Plantae
- Clade: Embryophytes
- Clade: Tracheophytes
- Clade: Angiosperms
- Clade: Eudicots
- Clade: Asterids
- Order: Asterales
- Family: Asteraceae
- Genus: Brachyglottis
- Species: B. bellidioides

Binomial name
- Brachyglottis bellidioides (Hook.f.) B.Nord.

= Brachyglottis bellidioides =

Species of flowering plant

Brachyglottis bellidioides is a species of flower known from the South Island of New Zealand.

== Description ==
A dark green leave with deep-set veins, with a long stalk with a yellow flower head and petals.

== Range ==
This species is endemic to the South Island of New Zealand.

== Habitat ==
Alpine and subalpine habitats.

== Ecology ==
Brachyglottis bellidioides has thick leaves, which push aside leaves of other plants, particularly pincushion grass Agrostis muscosa, in order to leave a small hollow from which the leaves can get sun and a stem can grow.

== Etymology ==
The species epithet notes that the plant is similar to Bellis.

== Taxonomy ==
Brachyglottis bellidioides contains the following varieties:

- Brachyglottis bellidioides var. angustata
- Brachyglottis bellidioides var. bellidioides
- Brachyglottis bellidioides var. crassa
- Brachyglottis bellidioides var. orbiculata
- Brachyglottis bellidioides var. setosa

Some authors have argued that on the basis of clinal morphology, there is only a single species of Brachyglottis in New Zealand, which would subsume Brachyglotts bellidioides into Brachyglottis lagopus.
