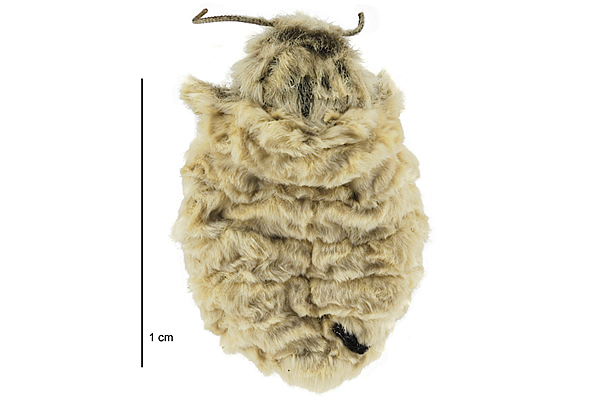
- Female specimen
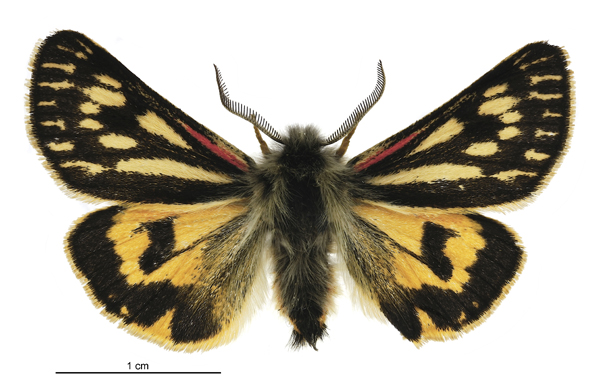
- Male specimen

Scientific classification
- Kingdom: Animalia
- Phylum: Arthropoda
- Clade: Pancrustacea
- Class: Insecta
- Order: Lepidoptera
- Superfamily: Noctuoidea
- Family: Erebidae
- Subfamily: Arctiinae
- Genus: Metacrias
- Species: M. huttoni

Binomial name
- Metacrias huttoni (Butler, 1879)

Synonyms
- Phaos huttonii Butler, 1879; Phaos huttoni (Butler, 1879); Metacrias huttonii (Butler, 1879)

= Metacrias huttoni =

Species of moth endemic to New Zealand

Metacrias huttoni, known as the Alpine tiger or Alpine tiger moth, is a species of moth in the family Erebidae. This species is endemic to New Zealand, where it is known from the eastern areas of the South Island. The female of the species is flightless and buff coloured whereas the male is brightly coloured and flies during the day.

== Taxonomy ==
This species was described by Arthur Gardiner Butler in 1879 using two specimens collected in Queenstown by Frederick Hutton and named Phaos huttonii. In 1886 Edward Meyrick assigned this species to the genus Metacrias. George Hudson discussed and illustrated this species in his 1898 publication New Zealand moths and butterflies (Macro-lepidoptera) using the name Metacrias huttonii. He again discussed and illustrated this species in his 1928 book The Butterflies and Moths of New Zealand. In this publication Hudson used the name Metacrias huttoni to describe the species following George Hampson's use of that spelling in his Catalogue of Lepidoptera Phalaenae in the British Museum. This spelling has since been in common use as evidenced in the New Zealand Inventory of Biodiversity, New Zealand Arthropod Collection as well as the Museum of New Zealand Te Papa Tongarewa. The holotype specimen is held at the Natural History Museum, London.

== Description ==
The larvae of this species are approximately 2.5 cm (0.98 in) long, black and very hairy. The hairs on the terminal segments are the longest and the shortest hairs are reddish-ochreous-brown. There is are blue dots around each segment except the second.

Adults males are brightly coloured and diurnal, while females are buff coloured and extremely short winged.

Butler described the species as follows:

primaries pale ochraceous, with the borders and veins rather broadly black, a submarginal transverse black line or stripe, or these wings might perhaps better be described as black, with an abbreviated basal dash, a cuneiform discoidal dash, an interno-median longitudinal streak, five subconfluent longitudinal discal dashes, and a submarginal series of small conical spots pale ochraceous; a basal subcostal carmine streak; secondaries bright ochreous, greyish on interno-median area; an oblique black spot on the discocellulars; outer border, to beyond the first median branch, broadly black, uniting with a large subanal marginal black spot, and intersected by an interrupted macular ochreous line close to the margin; fringe ochreous; body black, with sordid whitish fringes to the tegulae; abdomen with ochraceous borders; wings below ochreous with black discocellular spots; outer borders black, intersected by a series of ochreous dots; costal borders dark orange, the primaries with an ill-defined subcostal carmine streak; body black, pectus fringed with pale sericeous hair; tibiae and tarsi of legs ochreous; anterior femora carmine in front; venter bordered and banded with ochreous. Expanse of wings 1 inch 3 lines.

== Distribution ==
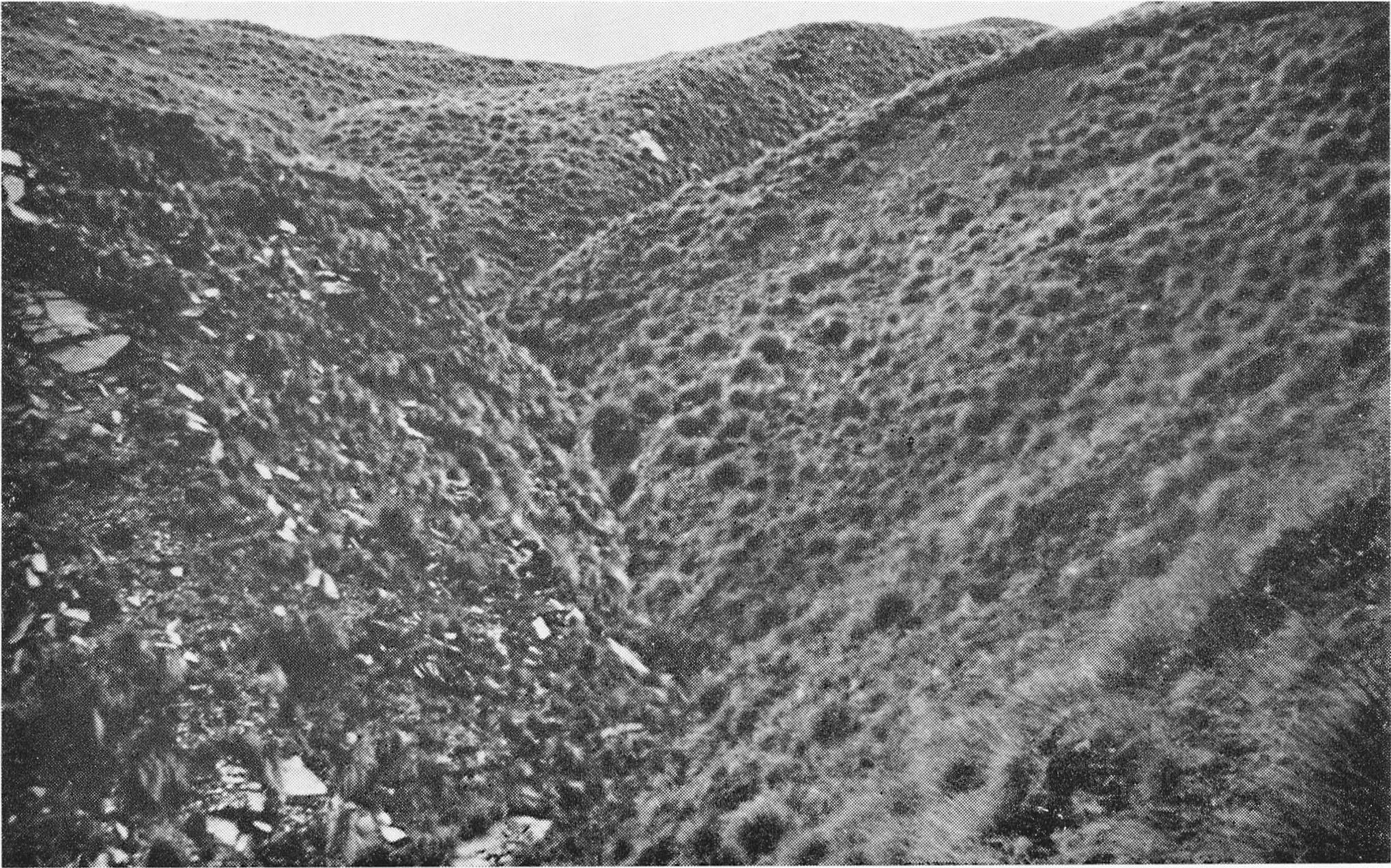
Habitat of Metacrias huttoni on Coronet Peak.

This species is endemic to New Zealand. It is known from the eastern areas of the South Island.

== Biology and behaviour ==
The female of the species is semiapterious and remains within her cocoon for mating and egg laying. As a result of this, the population disbursal of the species is limited to the wanderings of the larvae. The male of the species is diurnal and is on the wing from December to March. Males are attracted to females by pheromones. Males of this species can be attracted to the scent of females of different species within their genus. Researchers have used females as lures to take advantage of this behaviour to detect males in new localities. The larvae hibernates during winter. Pupae cocoons are normally found beneath stones.

== Habitat and host species ==
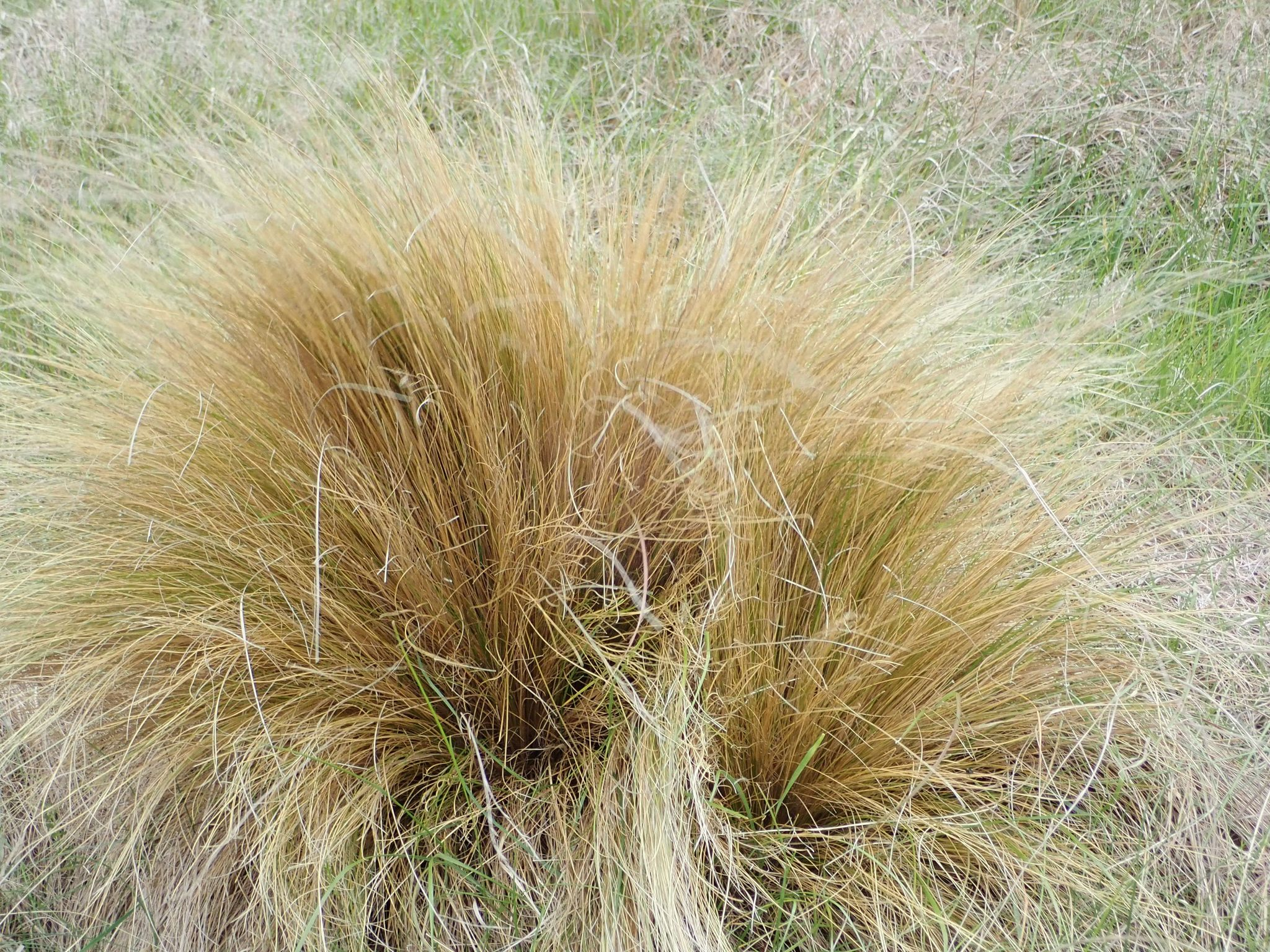
Larval host species Festuca novae-zelandiae.

This species prefers montane to low-alpine habitats. The larvae of M. huttoni feed on various mountain grasses. These include introduced species such as Trifolium repens, Arenaria serpyllifolia, Rumex acetosella, Cerastium fontanum and Taraxacum officinale as well as endemic species such as Festuca novae-zelandiae and indigenous species from the genera Acaena, Muehlenbeckia, Wahlenbergia and Raoulia.

== Threats ==
It has been shown that sheep grazing within the habitat of this species is detrimental to its populations. M. huttoni is a host species for the parasitoid wasps Echthromorpha intricatoria and Cotesia urabae.
