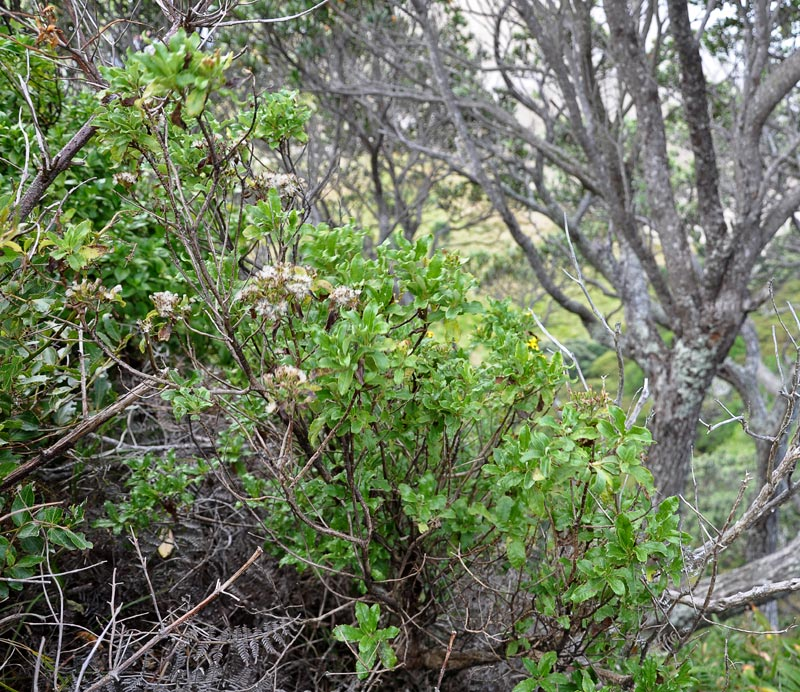

Conservation status
- Near Threatened (IUCN 2.3)

Scientific classification
- Kingdom: Plantae
- Clade: Embryophytes
- Clade: Tracheophytes
- Clade: Spermatophytes
- Clade: Angiosperms
- Clade: Eudicots
- Clade: Asterids
- Order: Asterales
- Family: Asteraceae
- Genus: Brachyglottis
- Species: B. perdicioides

Binomial name
- Brachyglottis perdicioides (Hook.f.) B.Nordenstam

= Brachyglottis perdicioides =

Species of flowering plant

Brachyglottis perdicioides, commonly known as raukūmara, is a species of flowering plant in the family Asteraceae. It is endemic to New Zealand.

== Description ==
Brachyglottis perdicioides is a shrub with thin branches that grows up to two metres tall. It has small yellow flowers and bright green serrated leaves.

== Distribution and habitat ==
Raukūmara is found only on the North Island of New Zealand, around the East Coast and Māhia Peninsula. It grows in coastal shrubland and forest but is tolerant of a range of a wide range of habitats.

== Conservation ==
Raukūmara has been classified as near threatened under the IUCN system. Habitat loss is a significant factor. However, mature plants can survive in pasture as they do not appear to be browsed by livestock.
