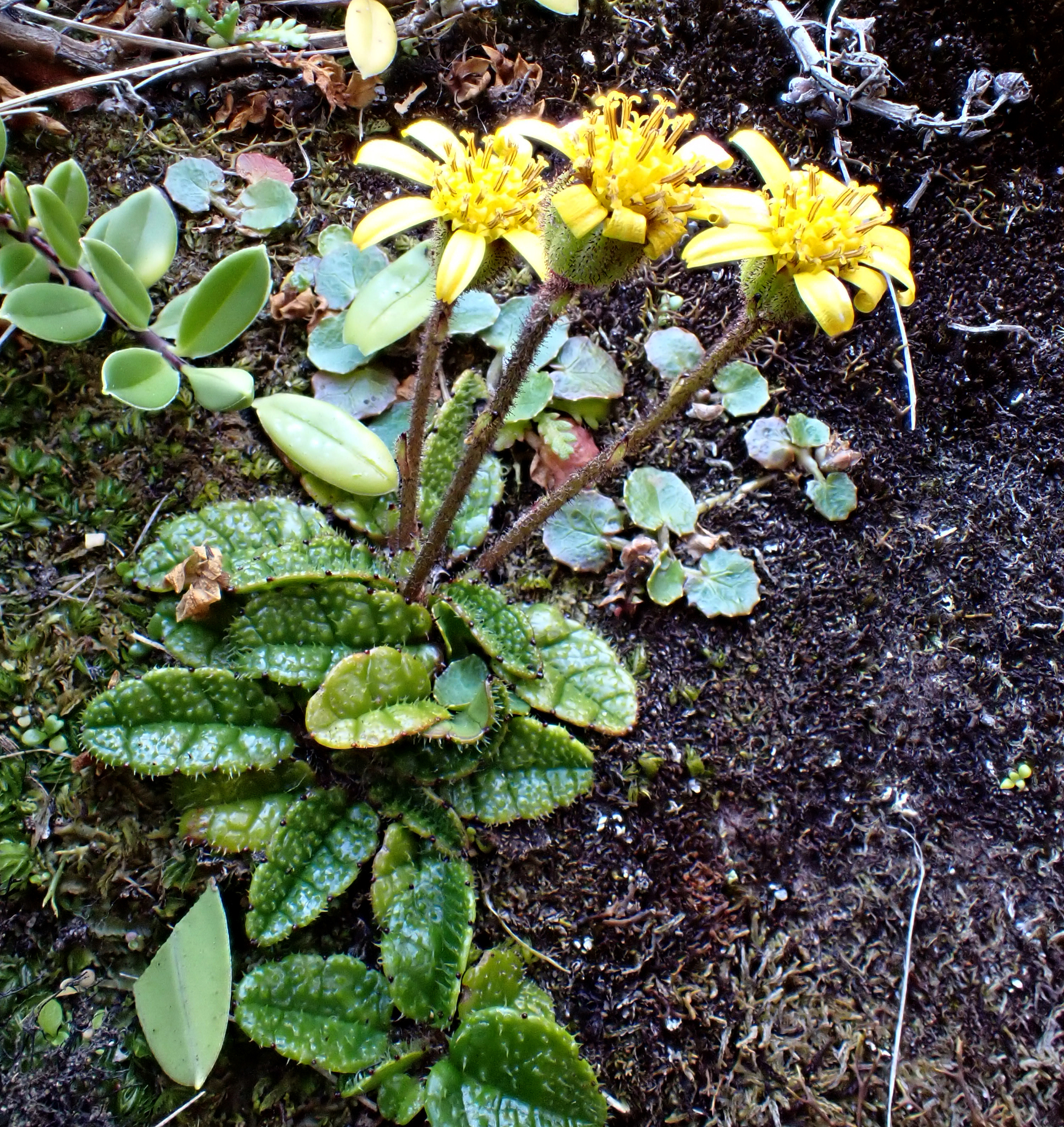

Scientific classification
- Kingdom: Plantae
- Clade: Tracheophytes
- Clade: Angiosperms
- Clade: Eudicots
- Clade: Asterids
- Order: Asterales
- Family: Asteraceae
- Genus: Brachyglottis
- Species: B. traversii

Binomial name
- Brachyglottis traversii (F.Muell.) B.Nord.

= Brachyglottis traversii =

Species of flowering plant

Brachyglottis traversii is a naturally uncommon endemic plant in New Zealand.
