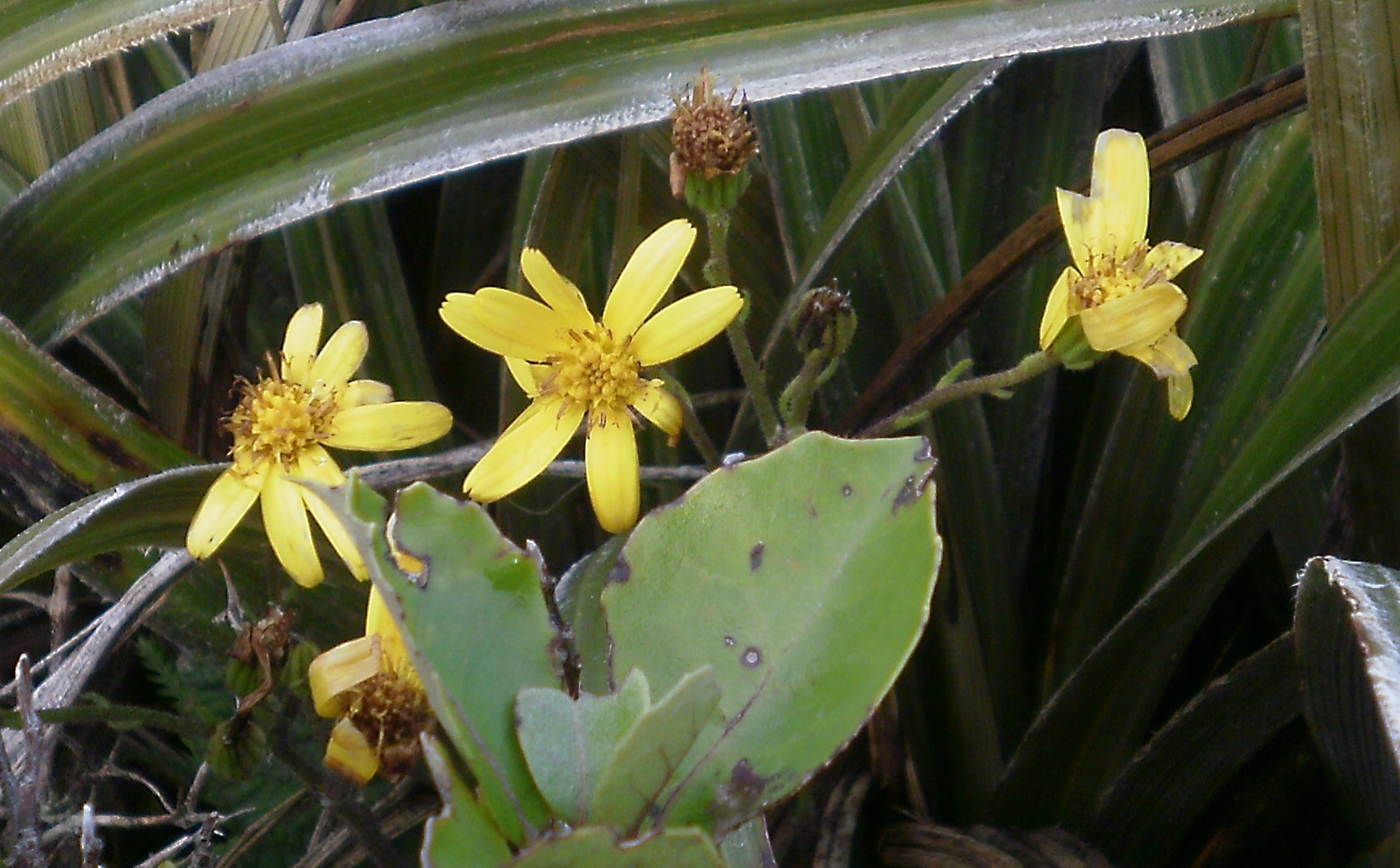
- Flowers of Brachyglottis lagopus

Conservation status
- Not Threatened (NZ TCS)

Scientific classification
- Kingdom: Plantae
- Clade: Tracheophytes
- Clade: Angiosperms
- Clade: Eudicots
- Clade: Asterids
- Order: Asterales
- Family: Asteraceae
- Genus: Brachyglottis
- Species: B. lagopus

Binomial name
- Brachyglottis lagopus (Raoul) B.Nord.

Synonyms
- Senecio lagopus Raoul

= Brachyglottis lagopus =

Species of flowering plant

Brachyglottis lagopus, commonly called mountain daisy or yellow rock daisy, is a small flowering plant native to New Zealand. B. lagopus is a variable species and can have large and very hairy leaves, and in other regions it has small leaves. Its flowers are yellow.

== Description ==
Brachyglottis lagopus may grow up to 45 cm tall, but is generally smaller. The leaves form a rosette appressed to the ground, but may become erect or spreading, occasionally forming multiple rosettes. The leaves may reach 25 cm long and are variably hairy, but are often covered in dense trichomes. The inflorescence can bear up to 50 yellow capitula, each 8–18 mm in diameter. A capitulum is composed of 8–18 ray florets and 14–72 disc florets. Fruit are achenes up to 6 mm long and bear a setose pappus.
