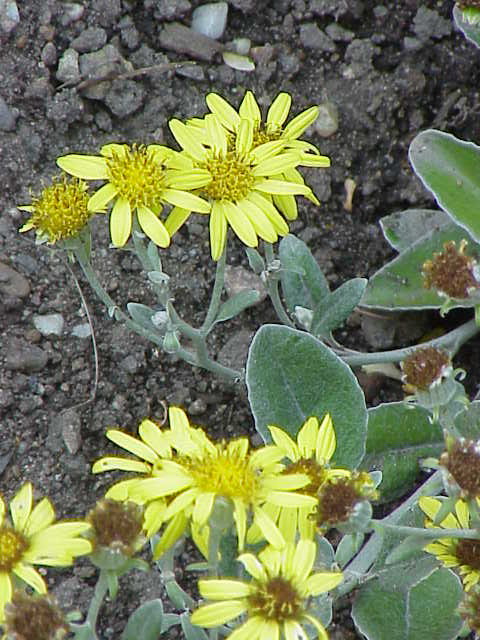

Scientific classification
- Kingdom: Plantae
- Clade: Tracheophytes
- Clade: Angiosperms
- Clade: Eudicots
- Clade: Asterids
- Order: Asterales
- Family: Asteraceae
- Genus: Brachyglottis
- Species: B. greyi

Binomial name
- Brachyglottis greyi (Hook. f.) B. Nord.

Synonyms
- Senecio greyi Hook.f.

= Brachyglottis greyi =

Species of flowering plant

Brachyglottis greyi, commonly known as daisy bush, is a member of the large family Asteraceae and belongs to the genus Brachyglottis or the genus Senecio depending on which authority is being followed. It is an endemic native of New Zealand and lately getting positive attention from gardeners.

== Description ==
Often seen in gardens and suitable for warm and maritime districts and tolerant of hot sun, poor soils, wind and coastal exposure, the New Zealand native broadleaf evergreen shrub Brachyglottis greyi can be found sprawled in the hot sun, poor soils and coastal breezes; maturing into mounds 1.2 metres (4 ft) to 1.5 metres (5 ft) tall and 1.8 metres (6 ft) wide.

B. greyi has somewhat curving stems, covered in white down. Leaves are alternate, simple, oblong to ovate-oblong, 4 centimetres (2 in) to 8 centimetres (3 in) long and 2.5 centimetres (1 in) to 4 centimetres (2 in) wide with wavy margins. Green above, white down underneath, giving silver-grey appearance. B. greyi forms panicles of bright yellow daisy flowers in abundance.

== In horticulture ==
A group of hybrids, from New Zealand, between Brachyglottis greyi, Brachyglottis laxifolia, and Brachyglottis compacta and misidentified in gardens as Senecio greyi or Senecio laxifolius.

These hybrids are hardy where it is warm and dry, they do well in coastal areas similar to where their parents live and mature into sprawling bushes of highly attractive foliage usually wider than high. Greyish foliage, the undersides of the leaves and stems are covered in white down and spectacular when in bloom with branching heads of brilliant yellow daisy-flowers.

The best known is "Sunshine" originally from New Zealand.

"Moria Read" is a variation of "Sunshine" whose leaves have a central, variously shaped areas of cream and pale green. It originated at Liskeard, Cornwall.

== Distribution ==
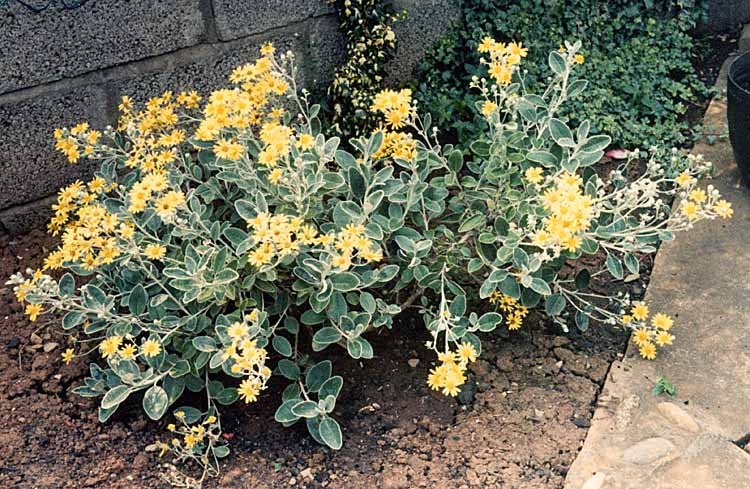
Brachyglottis greyi, about 0.8 metres across in this picture.

Primarily a coastal species of rock outcrops and bluffs but may extend inland up river gorges and in suitably exposed bluff habitats. Confined to the southern North Island of New Zealand from near Flat Point south to the mouth of the Ōrongorongo River.
