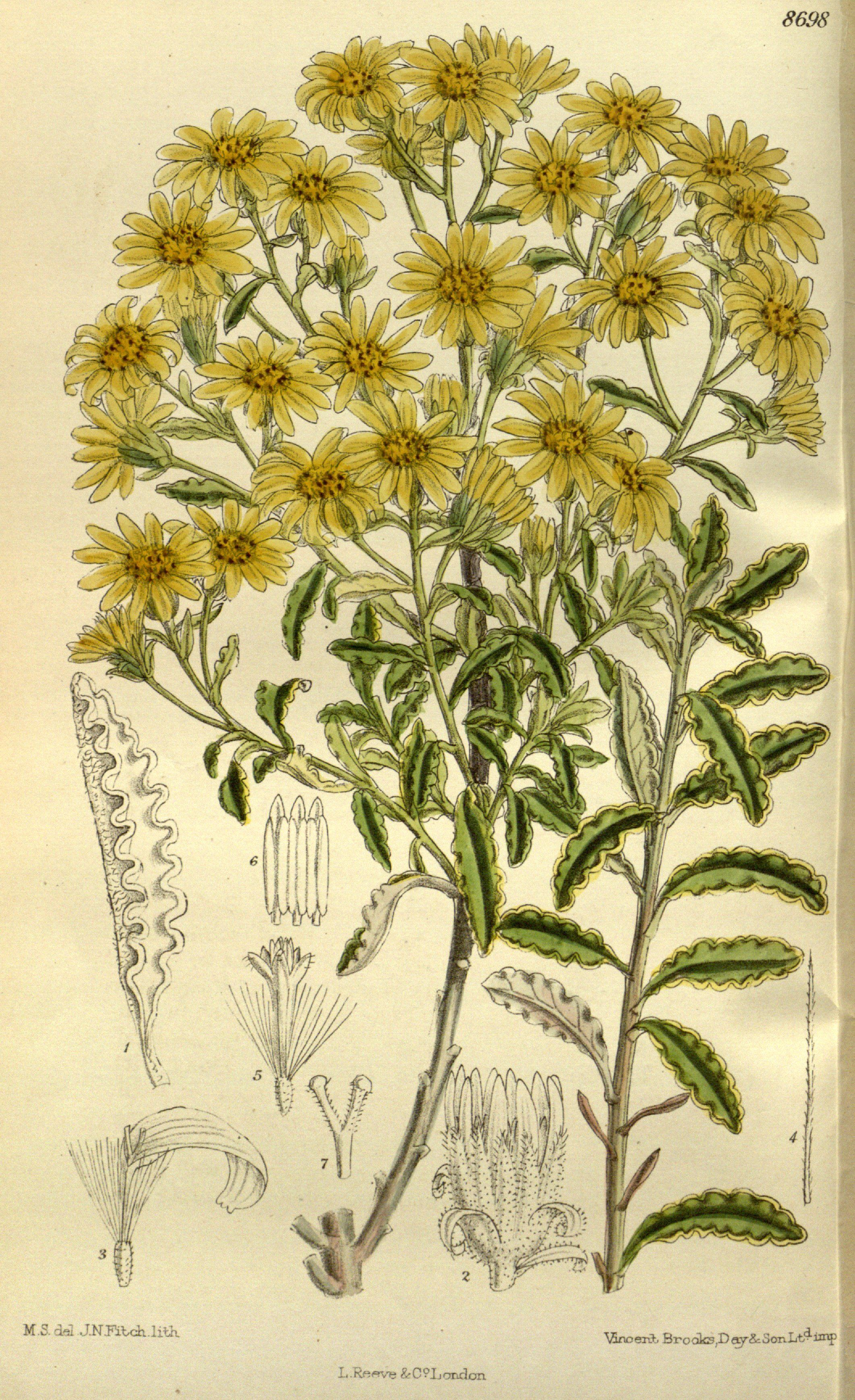

Scientific classification
- Kingdom: Plantae
- Clade: Tracheophytes
- Clade: Angiosperms
- Clade: Eudicots
- Clade: Asterids
- Order: Asterales
- Family: Asteraceae
- Genus: Brachyglottis
- Species: B. monroi

Binomial name
- Brachyglottis monroi (Hook. f.) B. Nord.

= Brachyglottis monroi =

Species of flowering plant

Brachyglottis monroi (Monro's ragwort; syn. Senecio monroi) is a species of plant in the family Asteraceae, formerly classified in the genus Senecio. Native to New Zealand and Tasmania, it is a small, hardy, evergreen shrub growing to 1 m (3 ft 3 in) with crinkly-edged, olive green, leathery leaves and yellow daisy-like flowers in terminal corymbs in summer.
