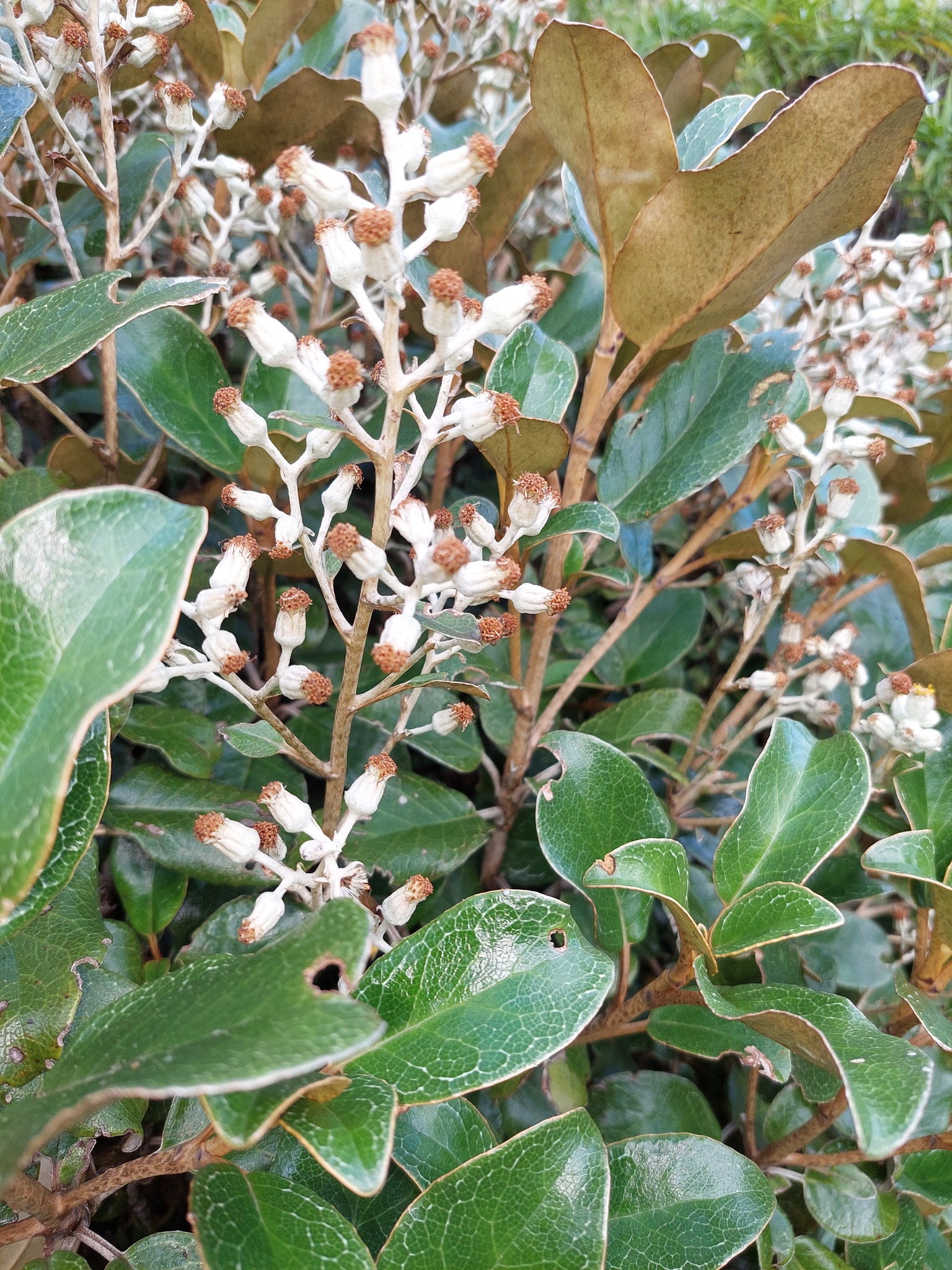

Scientific classification
- Kingdom: Plantae
- Clade: Tracheophytes
- Clade: Angiosperms
- Clade: Eudicots
- Clade: Asterids
- Order: Asterales
- Family: Asteraceae
- Genus: Brachyglottis
- Species: B. elaeagnifolia

Binomial name
- Brachyglottis elaeagnifolia (Hook.f.) B.Nord.

Synonyms
- Senecio elaeagnifolia

= Brachyglottis elaeagnifolia =

Species of flowering plant

Brachyglottis elaeagnifolia is a species of flowering plant in the family Asteraceae. It is endemic to New Zealand, where it is mostly limited to the North Island.It is similar to several other species characterised by shrubby habit and the absence of ray florets, e.g., B. rotundifolia, B. cockaynei.

== Description ==
Brachyglottis elaeagnifolia is a shrub which grows to a height of 3 metres. The branches are grooved and the smaller branches and petioles are coated in whitish or pale brownish hairs. The leathery leaves are widely lance-shaped to oblong and up to 9 centimetres long. The upper surfaces are shiny and hairless and the undersides have silvery whitish or brownish hairs. The inflorescence is a panicle of woolly flower heads containing disc florets. The fruit is an achene 1 to 2 millimetres long with a pappus of barbed white hairs up to 5 millimetres long. The colour of the flowers is yellow.

== Distribution and habitat ==
Volcanic debris on Mount Taranaki has been colonised by this species, which occurs in dense stands up to 100 years old.

It is found widespread in the mountains in the North Island in montane shrubland. It can also be found in the Marlborough Sounds, South Island, in open upland forest.Taxonomic uncertainty means that its southern distribution is unclear, with plants commonly identified as B. elaeagnifolia throughout the west of the South Island, in addition to its accepted North Island distribution.
