= Cheeseman =

Cheeseman is a surname, meaning a maker or seller of cheese. Over time, the name has been spelt in a variety of different ways, including Cheesman, Cheseman, Chesman, Chessman, Chiesman and Chisman. Notable people with the surname include:

- Andrea Chesman, American author of cookbooks
- Camaron Cheeseman (born 1998), American football player
- Dave Cheeseman (born 1978), British musician
- Darren Cheeseman (born 1976), Australian politician
- Ellen Cheeseman (1848–1928), painter and botanist from New Zealand
- Emma Cheeseman (1846–1927/28), painter and taxidermist from New Zealand
- Gareth Cheeseman, fictional character in the stage play "Death of a Salesman"
- Gwen Cheeseman (born 1951), American hockey player
- John Cheeseman (disambiguation), several people
- Joseph James Cheeseman (1843–1896), 12th president of Liberia
- Pete Chisman (1940–2003), British racing cyclist
- Peter Cheeseman (1932–2010), British theatre director
- Samuel Cheeseman (1857–1942), American politician from Pennsylvania
- Thomas Cheeseman (disambiguation), several people

== See also ==
- Mount Cheeseman, New Zealand
- Cheeseman the Game
- Chiesmans, a former London department store group
