= Chisman =

Chisman is a surname. Notable people with the surname include:

- Peter Chisman (1940–2003), British racing cyclist
- William W. Chisman (1843–1925), Union Army soldier

== See also ==
- Cheesman
- Cheeseman
