= Thomas Cheeseman (disambiguation) =

Thomas Cheeseman (1846–1923) was a New Zealand botanist.

Thomas Cheeseman may also refer to:

- Thomas Cheseman (ca. 1488–1536 or later), English politician
- Thomas Cheesman (cricketer) (1816–1874), English cricketer
- Tom Cheeseman (born 1986), Welsh rugby union footballer
- Thomas Cheesman (clergyman), see Aston Tirrold
- Thomas Cheesman (engraver) (1760–1834), British engraver
