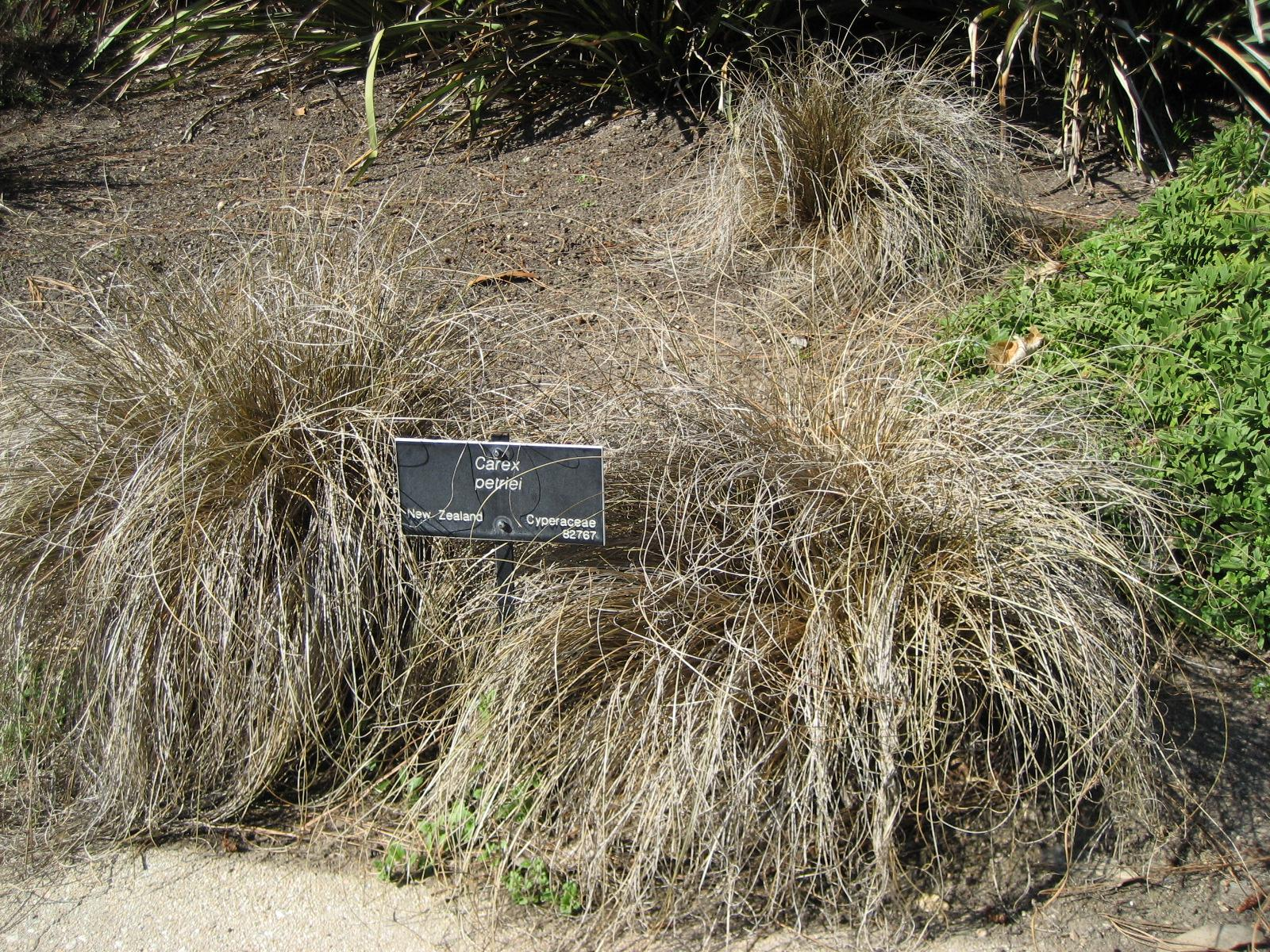
- At Huntington Gardens, California

Scientific classification
- Kingdom: Plantae
- Clade: Tracheophytes
- Clade: Angiosperms
- Clade: Monocots
- Clade: Commelinids
- Order: Poales
- Family: Cyperaceae
- Genus: Carex
- Species: C. petriei

Binomial name
- Carex petriei Cheeseman

= Carex petriei =

Species of flowering plant

Carex petriei, the dwarf brown sedge, is a species of flowering plant in the family Cyperaceae, native to New Zealand. It can be used where a brown to copper-coloured ground cover is desired.
