= Clara Cheeseman =

English-born New Zealand novelist

Clara Cheeseman (16 July 1852 – 1943) was a novelist from England who emigrated to New Zealand as a child.

== Biography ==
Cheeseman was born in Doncaster, England in 1852 and emigrated to New Zealand with her family, arriving in Auckland on 4 April 1854 on the Artemesia. Her father was Thomas Cheeseman, a Methodist minister who moved the family to New Zealand in the hope that the climate would cure a throat ailment he suffered from. She had four siblings: two brothers, William and Thomas, and two sisters, Emma and Ellen.

Cheeseman's brother Thomas became curator of the Auckland Museum and she, Emma and Ellen accompanied him on field trips.

Cheeseman wrote magazine articles, one of which was published in the Australian Ladies' Annual 1878 and a novel, The Rolling Stone, which was published in 1886.
