= Cheesman =

Cheesman is a surname, meaning a maker or seller of cheese. Notable people with the surname include:

- Barry Cheesman, American professional golfer
- Clive Cheesman, officer of arms at the College of Arms in London
- Edith Cheesman (1877–1964), British artist
- Georgie Cheesman, British architect, better known by her married name of Georgie Wolton
- Ernest Entwistle Cheesman (1898–1983), English botanist specialising in Musaceae
- Evelyn Cheesman, British entomologist and explorer
- Darren Cheesman, English field hockey player
- Jenny Cheesman, Australian women's basketball player and captain
- Linda Cheesman, American bodybuilder and figure competitor
- Paul R. Cheesman (1921–1991), American archeologist and a professor of religion at Brigham Young University
- Robert Ernest Cheesman (1878–1962), British military officer, explorer and ornithologist
- Thomas Cheesman (cricketer) (1816–1874), English cricketer
- Thomas Cheesman (engraver) (1760–1834), English engraver
- Walter Cheesman (1838–1907), American capitalist: railroad, real estate, water, mining
- Wendy Cheesman, British architect and founding member of Team 4, also known by her married name of Wendy Foster
- William Norwood Cheesman, British mycologist

== See also ==
- Cheesman's Gerbil, a gerbil of the Arabian Peninsula
- Cheesman Park, an urban park in Denver, Colorado
- Cheeseman, a surname
