= Thomas Gilliland =

British journalist and theatre critic

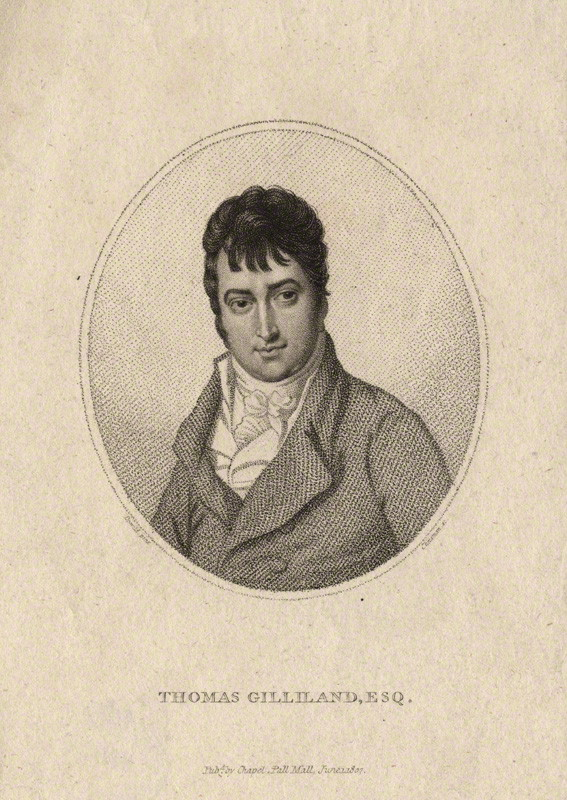
Thomas Gilliland, 1807 engraving by Thomas Cheesman, after Samuel De Wilde

Thomas Gilliland (fl. 1804–1837) was a combative British journalist and theatre critic. According to attack pieces in The Satirist, or Monthly Meteor, he was "countenanced" by Matthew "Monk" Lewis and Thomas Moore, and frequented the green room of Drury Lane Theatre until Charles Mathews and other actors complained he was spying for scandalmonger Anthony Pasquin. Gilliland's 1806 pamphlet Diamond cut Diamond defended the future George IV, then Prince of Wales, against Nathaniel Jefferys's attack, for which the Prince gave him 500 guineas. In 1809, Mary Anne Clarke, the royal mistress of Prince Frederick, Duke of York and Albany was about to publish scandalous Memoirs, until Gilliland helped arrange a deal to buy and destroy the publishers' copies. Many attacks on the Duke were published the same year and erroneously rumoured to have been Clarke's memoirs. In 1810 Gilliland collaborated on The Rival Princes, a response to the attacks published in Clarke's name.

In 1816 the Prince of Wales, now Prince Regent, granted Gilliland an annuity of £400, formalised by a contract of June 1817. In 1827, Gilliland bought what he claimed was a portrait of Shakespeare, an identification not otherwise supported.

Edmund Henry Barker's Literary Anecdotes and Contemporary Reminiscences includes several he heard from Gilliland when both were imprisoned for debt in the Fleet in 1837.

== Works ==
Gilliland wrote:

- A Dramatic Synopsis, containing an Essay on the Political and Moral Use of a Theatre, involving Remarks on the Dramatic Writers of the Present Day and Strictures on the Performers of the two Theatres, London, 1804. John Joseph Knight said it "contains some sensible opinions".
- Elbow Room, a Pamphlet containing Remarks on the shameful Increase of the Private Boxes of Covent Garden, London, 1804. A satire on John Philip Kemble's management. The Critical Review called it "very scurrilous, and very ridiculous".
- Jack in Office, containing Remarks on Mr. Braham's Address to the Public, with a full and impartial consideration of Mr. Kemble's conduct with regard to the above gentleman, London, n.d. (1804). Another satire on Kemble, referencing opera singer John Braham.
- Diamond cut Diamond: Observations on a Pamphlet entitled "A Review of the Conduct of His Royal Highness the Prince of Wales", comprising a free and impartial View of Mr. Jefferys as a Tradesman, Politician, and Courtier. By Philo Veritas, 1806.
- The Diamond New Pointed; being a Supplement to "Diamond cut Diamond:" containing Three Letters which Mr. Jefferys sent to Earl Moira, with a view to obtain Money from His Royal Highness the Prince of Wales; with Observations thereon, including Remarks on his Letter to Mrs. Fitzherbert. By Philo Veritas, 1806.
- The Dramatic Mirror, containing the History of the Stage from the Earliest Period to the Present Time, London, 1808, 2 vols., an expansion of the Synopsis. It has information on the provincial theatres, and biographies of the principal actors from the time of Shakespeare and of dramatic writers subsequent to 1660. It was illustrated with portraits and other engravings, and dedicated to the Prince of Wales. Although Knight called it "of little merit", it has been cited in recent scholarship on the history of English theatre.
- The Trap, a Moral, Philosophical, and Satirical Work, delineating the Snares in which Kings, Princes, and their Subjects have been caught since the days of Adam; including Reflections on the Present Causes of Conjugal Infidelity. Dedicated to the Ladies, London, 1808, 2 vols., a satire Knight calls "dull and indecorous".

The engraver John Thomas Smith called Gilliland "my worthy friend" and "author of the celebrated pamphlet of 'Diamond cut Diamond,' and, I believe, about sixteen or seventeen others in defence and support of the English government".
