= Chessman =

Chessman may refer to:

- Caryl Chessman (1921–1960), American criminal and author, recipient of the death penalty
- Chessman (wrestler), professional wrestler with AAA
- Chess piece

== See also ==
- Cheeseman, a surname
