= John Cheeseman =

John Chees(e)man may refer to:

- John T. Cheeseman, businessman and politician in Newfoundland
- John Cheseman, MP for New Romney
- John Cheesman, Virginia politician
