= Twin Zero =

- Origin: United Kingdom
- Genres: Post-rock, progressive rock, sludge metal, post-metal, progressive metal
- Years active: 2003–present
- Labels: Futhermocker Records (2004), Undergroove Recordings (2004- present)
- Members: Karl Middleton, Reuben Gotto, Bing Garcia, Dave Cheeseman, Dylan Griffiths, Ben Calvert, Paul Jackson
- Past members: Si Hutchby, Anf Morfitt, Jay Graham

Twin Zero are a British progressive rock band, formed in 2003.

== Biography ==
The band's first release was 7" vinyl "Earthbound" on Danish label Futhermocker Records. Released in November 2004, this featured one 7 minute track split over both sides of the record.

In January 2005, the band's debut album Monolith was released on Undergroove Recordings. Following a tour with Boston-based band 27, the bands collaborated in a split EP 27:00, released on Undergroove in August 2005. This EP featured two tracks by each band, plus a remix created from elements of all four songs by Reuben Gotto.

In July 2006, the band released their second album The Tomb to Every Hope again on Undergroove Recordings. This album featured a second bonus disc of remixes of material from debut album Monolith.

The band features a revolving list of musicians, and often features different combinations of musicians at live shows, including two drummers, and occasionally a fully instrumental line-up.

== Current line-up ==
- Karl Middleton - vocals
- Reuben Gotto - guitar
- Bing Garcia - guitar
- Dylan Griffiths - bass guitar
- Dave Cheeseman - keyboards
- Paul Jackson - drums
- Ben Calvert - drums

== Former members ==
- Anf Morfitt - bass guitar
- Si Hutchby - drums
- Jay Graham - drums

== Discography ==
- Earthbound (7" Single, 2004) Futhermocker Records
- Monolith (2005) Undergroove Records
- 27:00 (Split EP, 2005) Undergroove Records
- The Tomb To Every Hope (2006) Undergroove Records
