= Ellen Cheeseman =

New Zealand artist (1848–1928)

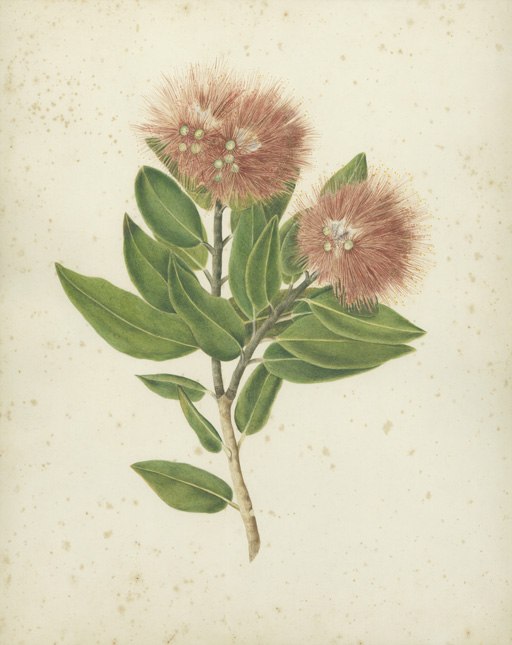
Watercolour on paper by Ellen Cheeseman of Metrosideros excelsa (pōhutukawa)

Ellen Maud Cheeseman (6 September 1848 – 1928) was a painter and botanist from England who emigrated to New Zealand as a child. Her watercolour paintings of New Zealand birds, animals and landscapes are in the permanent collection of Auckland War Memorial Museum.

== Biography ==
Cheeseman was born in England in 1848 and emigrated to New Zealand with her family, arriving in Auckland on 4 April 1854 on the Artemesia. Her mother was Eliza Cawkwell and her father, was Thomas Cheeseman (snr). She had four siblings: two brothers, William and Thomas, and two sisters, Emma and Clara.

Cheeseman worked with her brother Thomas, the curator of Auckland Museum, on projects to document New Zealand's flora and wildlife. She produced detailed, coloured paintings of butterflies, lizards, insects, shells and birds. In 1899 she and Thomas went on a government-funded trip to the Cook Islands to record the flora of the islands.

Cheeseman was a member of the New Zealand Naturalist Society and went on field trips with the group, painting the landscapes of their destinations, such as Thames River and the Coromandel Peninsula. Her art was also published in the Naturalist Society journal.

Cheeseman's botanical art is also held in the New Zealand National Herbarium Network library in Auckland.

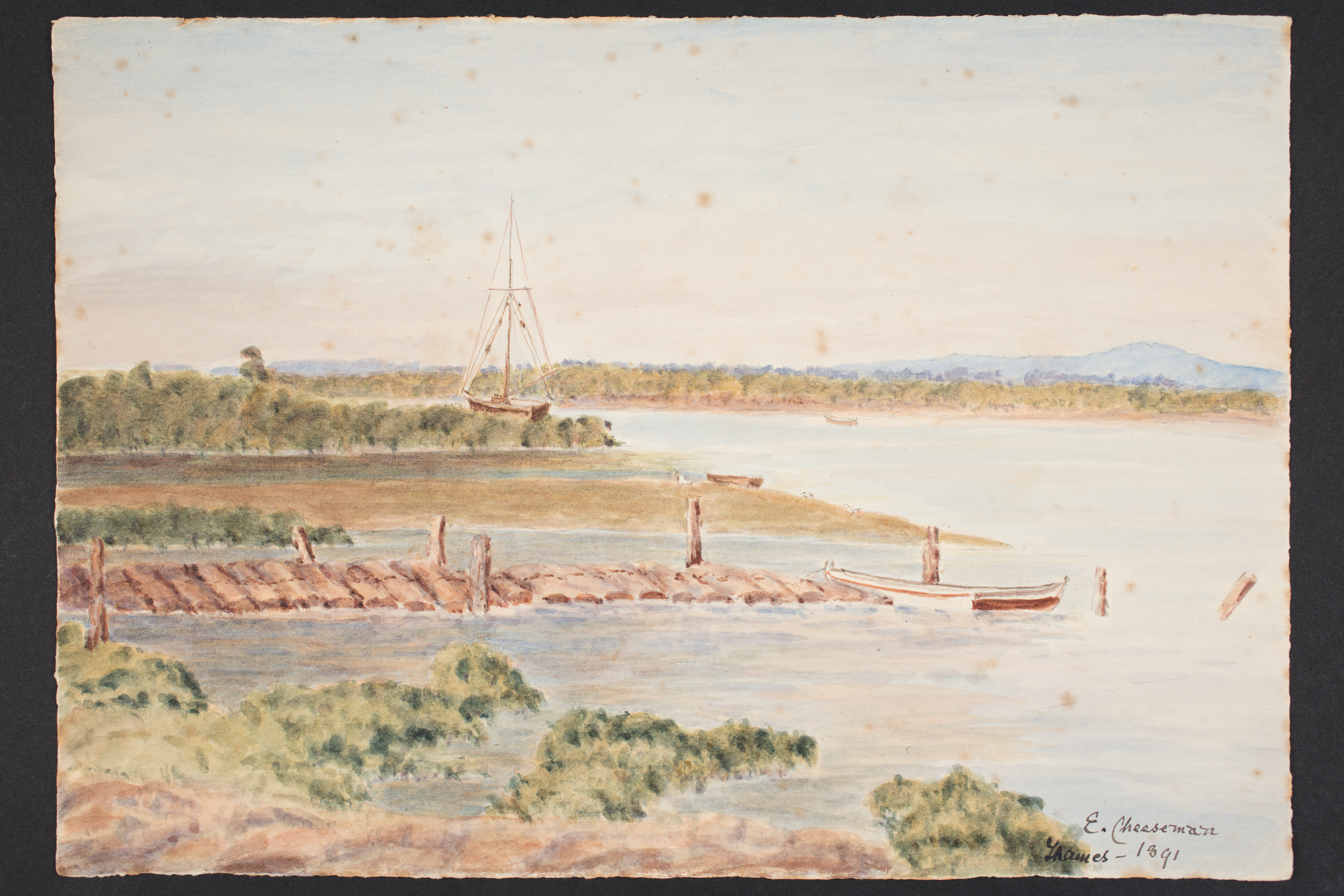
Watercolour of Thames River with dinghy tied to end of jetty by Ellen Cheeseman

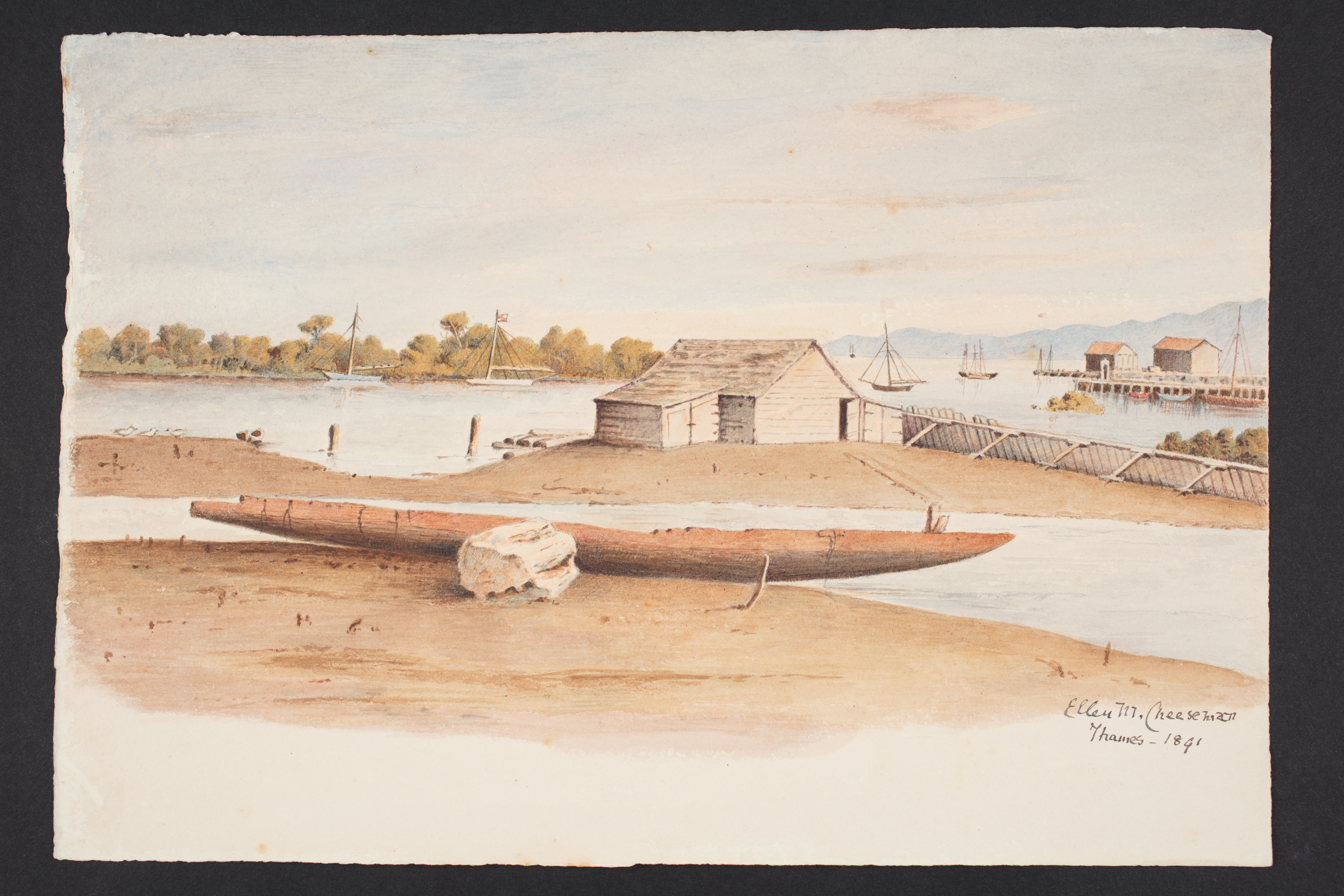
Watercolour of Thames River with native canoe in foreground, wooden dwelling in background by Ellen Cheeseman
