= Andrea Chesman =

Andrea Chesman is the author of over twenty cookbooks and the editor of well over a hundred cookbooks and gardening books. The original edition of her cookbook The Vegetarian Grill was a 1999 James Beard Cookbook Award nominee and recipient of a 1999 National Barbecue Association Award of Excellence. Her recipes have also been published in The Best of Food & Wine and The Family Circle Good Cook’s Book, among other anthologies.

Chesman is a contributor to magazines and newspapers, including Fine Cooking, Food & Wine, The New York Times, Cooking Light, Vegetarian Times, Organic Gardening, Natural Health, New England Monthly, The Burlington Free Press, Rocky Mountain News, The Denver Post, Edible Green Mountains and many other publications. She was contributing food editor for Vermont Life magazine for twelve years.

She also teaches and does cooking demonstrations and classes and has appeared at the Mother Earth News Fair, the Heritage Harvest Festival, the Bookmarks Festival of Books, the Boston Flower and Garden Show, the Rhode Island Spring Flower and Garden Show and the Decatur Book Festival.

Chesman also indexes non-fiction books for book publishers and blogs and tweets about food and gardening.

Andrea Chesman lives in an old farmhouse in Ripton, Vermont. The poet Robert Frost used to rent the cottage across the street and took his meals at her house (before she lived there). She is married and has two grown children. She is a graduate of Cornell University.

== Books ==
- The Pickled Pantry: From Apples to Zucchini, 185 Recipes for Pickles, Relishes, Chutneys & More. 2012. Storey Communications
- The New Vegetarian Grill, Revised Edition: 250 Flame-Kissed Recipes for Fresh, Inspired Meals. 2011. Harvard Common Press
- Recipes from the Root Cellar: 250 Fresh Ways to Enjoy Winter Vegetables. 2010. Storey Communications
- Serving Up the Harvest: Celebrating the Goodness of Fresh Vegetables. 2007. Storey Communications
- Mom's Best Crowd-Pleasers: 101 No-Fuss Recipes for Family Gatherings, Casual Get-Togethers & Surprise Company. 2006. Storey Communications
- The Garden-Fresh Vegetable Cookbook. 2005. Storey Communications
- Mom's Best One-Dish Suppers: 101 Easy Homemade Favorites, as Comforting Now as They Were Then. 2005. Storey Communications
- The Roasted Vegetable: How to Roast Everything from Artichokes to Zucchini. 2002. Harvard Common Press
- Mom's Best Desserts: 100 Classic Treats That Taste as Good Now as They Did Then. 2002. Storey Communications
- The Vegetarian Grill: 250 Recipes for Inspired Flame-Kissed Meals. 1998. Harvard Common Press
- 366 Delicious Ways to Cook Rice, Beans, and Grains. 1998. Penguin Group
- Salad Suppers: Fresh Inspirations for Satisfying One-Dish Meals. 1997. Storey Communications
- Simply Healthful Skillet Suppers. 1994. Storey Communications
- Simply Healthful Pasta Salads. 1993. Storey Communications
- The Great American Dessert Cookbook. 1990. Crossing Press
- Sun-Dried Tomatoes. 1990. Crossing Press
- Inventive Yankee. 1989. Rodale Press
- Summer in a Jar: Making Pickles, Jams and More. 1985. Williamson Publishing
- Salsas!. 1985. Crossing Press
- Favorite Pickles & Relishes: Storey's Country Wisdom Bulletin A-91. 1984. Storey Communications
- Pickles & Relishes: From Apples to Zucchini, 150 Recipes for Preserving the Harvest. 1983. Storey Communications
- 250 Treasured Country Desserts: Mouthwatering, Time-Honored, Tried & True, Soul-Satisfying, Handed-Down Sweet Comforts. (co-author with Fran Raboff) 2009. Storey Communications
- The Classic Zucchini Cookbook. (co-author with Nancy C. Ralston and Marynor Jordan) 2002. Storey Communications
- Sauces for Pasta!. (co-author with Kristie Trabant) 1990. Crossing Press
- Salad Dressings!. (co-author with Jane Dieckmann) 1987. Crossing Press
- Guide to Women's Publishing. (co-author with Polly Joan) 1978. Dustbooks

== Sources ==
- Taylor, Nicole A., prod. "Episode 84 - Andrea Chesman, John T. Edge, & The Hot Five." Hot Grease (food Culture Radio Show). Heritage Radio Network. Brooklyn, New York, 19 Sept. 2011. HeritageRadioNetwork.org. Heritage Radio Network. Web. <https://web.archive.org/web/20130531094037/http://www.heritageradionetwork.com/episodes/1823-Hot-Grease-Episode-84-Andrea-Chesman-John-T-Edge-The-Hot-Five%3E.
- Pasanen, Melissa. "Ripton Author Says Pickling Is Making a Comeback." Burlington Free Press 14 Sept. 2012: n. pag. Burlingtonfreepress.com. Burlington Free Press, 14 Sept. 2012. Web. <.
- THE ROASTED VEGETABLE (Book). Rotella, Mark; Zaleski, Jeff // Publishers Weekly; 1/21/2002, Vol. 249 Issue 3, p83 Reviews the book 'The Roasted Vegetable: How to Roast Everything from Artichokes to Zucchini for Big, Bold Flavors in Pasta, Pizza, Risotto, Side Dishes, Couscous, Salsa, Dips, Sandwiches, and Salads,' by Andrea Chesman.
- Summer in a Jar (Book). Diebold, Ruth; Fletcher, Janet // Library Journal; 7/1/1985, Vol. 110 Issue 12, p72 Reviews the book 'Summer in a Jar: Making Pickles, Jams and More,' by Andrea Chesman.
- Pickles & Relishes (Book). R.D. // Library Journal; 5/15/1983, Vol. 108 Issue 10, p1003 Reviews the book 'Pickles & Relishes: 130 Recipes, Apples to Zucchini,' by Andrea Chesman.
- Pestos! cooking with herb paste. R.D. // Library Journal; 12/1/1985, Vol. 110 Issue 20, p108 Reviews two recipe books. 'Pestos! cooking with herb paste,' by Dorothy Rankin; 'Salsas!,' by Andrea Chesman.
- The Roasted Vegetable (Book). Sutton, Judith // Library Journal; 2/15/2002, Vol. 127 Issue 3, p173 Reviews the book 'The Roasted Vegetable,' by Andrea Chesman.
- New Books & Products. Sutton, Judith // Home Cooking; Feb2007, Vol. 35 Issue 1, p44 The article features several products and books related to cookery, including The Kitchen Calc Pro for accurate arithmetic calculations in the kitchen, The Wine Lover's Calendar by Karen MacNeil and the book "Mom's Best Crowd Pleasers," by Andrea Chesman.
- Garden Way's Joy of Gardening Cookbook (Book). Diebold, Ruth // Library Journal; 5/15/1984, Vol. 109 Issue 8, p982 Reviews the book 'Garden Way's Joy of Gardening Cookbook,' by Janet Ballantyne, Andrea Chesman and Dottie Rankin.
- Sun-Dried Tomatoes!/Simply Shrimp (Book). Sutton, Judith C. // Library Journal; 5/15/1990, Vol. 115 Issue 9, p91 Reviews two books about cooking. "Sun-Dried Tomatoes!" by Andrea Chesman; "Simply Shrimp," by Glenn Day.
- The Great American Dessert Cookbook (Book). Sutton, J.C. // Library Journal; 11/15/1990, Vol. 115 Issue 20, p88 Reviews the book "The Great American Dessert Cookbook," by Andrea Chesman and Fran Raboff.
- Mom's Best Desserts (Book). Sutton, Judith // Library Journal; 11/15/2002, Vol. 127 Issue 19, p95 Reviews the book 'Mom's Best Desserts: 100 Classic Treats That Taste as Good Now as They Did Then,' by Andrea Chesman and Fran Raboff.
- The Inventive Yankee : From Rockets to Rollerskates, 200 Years of Yankee Inventors and Inventions. (Book). Miller, Patty // Library Journal; 4/1/1989, Vol. 114 Issue 6, p108 Reviews the book "The Inventive Yankee: From Rockets to Rollerskates, 200 Years of Yankee Inventors and Inventions," edited Andrea Chesman.
- The Garden-Fresh Vegetable Cookbook: Andrea Chesman's Bountiful Harvest of Home-Grown Recipes. Sutton, Judith // Library Journal; 6/15/2005, Vol. 130 Issue 11, p96 Reviews the book "The Garden-Fresh Vegetable Cookbook: Andrea Chesman's Bountiful Harvest of Home-Grown Recipes," by Andrea Chesman.
- Grill Like a Pro! Sutton, Judith // Vegetarian Times; Jul/Aug2009, Issue 369, p40 The article offers tips for vegetarians on grilling vegetables. Andrea Chesman, author of "The New Vegetarian Grill: 250 Flame-Kissed Recipes for Fresh, Inspired Meals," explains the impact of barbecuing on the flavor of summer vegetables.
- The Garden-Fresh Vegetable Cookbook: Andrea Chesman's Bountiful Harvest of Home-Grown Recipes. Sutton, Judith // Publishers Weekly; 5/23/2005, Vol. 252 Issue 21, p75 Reviews the book "The Garden-Fresh Vegetable Cookbook: Andrea Chesman's Bountiful Harvest of Home-Grown Recipes," by Andrea Chesman.
- COOKING. Campbell, Lisa // Library Journal; 8/1/2012, Vol. 137 Issue 13, p114 The article reviews several books about cooking including "The Great Meat Cookbook: Everything You Need to Know to Buy and Cook Today's Meat," by Bruce Aidells and Anne-Marie Ramo, "The Pickled Pantry: From Apples to Zucchini, 150 Recipes for Pickles, Relishes, Chutneys & More," by Andrea Chesman.
- Chesman, Andrea. "Pickles by the Pint." Fine Cooking 1 Aug. 1996: 58–61. Print.
- "Storey Publishing : Andrea Chesman." Storey Publishing : Andrea Chesman. Storey Publishing, n.d. Web. 30 Mar. 2013. <http://www.storey.com/author.php?ID=500004>.
- "Andrea Chesman: Workman Publishing." Andrea Chesman: Workman Publishing. Workman Publishing, n.d. Web. 30 Mar. 2013. <http://www.workman.com/authors/andrea_chesman/>.
- "About Andrea Chesman." Andrea Chesman. Penguin Group USA, n.d. Web. 30 Mar. 2013. <http://www.us.penguingroup.com/nf/Author/AuthorPage/0,,1000006766,00.html?sym=BIO>.
- "1999 James Beard Foundation Awards." StarChefs Presents the 1999 James Beard Foundation Awards. StarChefs, n.d. Web. 30 Mar. 2013. <http://www.starchefs.com/JBeard/99/book.html>.
- "Lectures & Demos - The Boston Flower & Garden Show | The Boston Flower & Garden Show." The Boston Flower & Garden Show. The Boston Flower & Garden Show, n.d. Web. 30 Mar. 2013. <https://web.archive.org/web/20130411031537/http://www.bostonflowershow.com/events-attractions/lectures-demos/?%3E.
- "2012 Seven Springs Schedule." Mother Earth News Fair. Mother Earth News, n.d. Web. 30 Mar. 2013. <https://web.archive.org/web/20121021012429/http://www.motherearthnews.com/uploadedFiles/Fair_New/Workshops/Seven_Springs_schedule.pdf%3E.
- "Heritage Harvest Festival at Monticello." Andrea Chesman, The Pickled Pantry. Southern Exposure Seed Exchange, n.d. Web. 30 Mar. 2013. <https://web.archive.org/web/20120915064440/http://heritageharvestfestival.com/2012/08/06/andrea-chesman-the-pickled-pantry/%3E.
- "2012 Authors." BOOKMARKS Festival of Books 2012 Authors. BOOKMARKS Festival of Books, n.d. Web. 30 Mar. 2013. <https://web.archive.org/web/20130301045732/http://bookmarksnc.org/book-festival/past-authors/2012-authors%3E.
- "Andrea Chesman." AJC Decatur Book Festival. Atlanta Journal-Constitution Decatur Book Festival, n.d. Web. 30 Mar. 2013. <https://web.archive.org/web/20110815003809/http://www.decaturbookfestival.com/2010/authors/detail.php?id=68%3E.
