= Samuel Cheeseman =

American politician

Samuel Lewis Cheeseman (December 23, 1857 – September 19, 1942) was an American politician and educator.

Samuel Lewis Cheeseman was born in Portersville, Pennsylvania, on December 23, 1857, to parents John Cheeseman and Abigail Coulter Cheeseman. His family was of English descent and traced its lineage back to Joseph Cheeseman, who immigrated in 1815. Samuel Cheeseman graduated from Slippery Rock State Normal School in 1891, and was superintendent of school for Butler County from 1896 to 1899. He served a single term on the Pennsylvania House of Representatives from 1913 to 1914 as a Republican, and did not contest the 1915 election cycle.

Samuel Cheeseman married Clara E. Watson, who was of Scottish descent. The couple raised three sons and two daughters. Their son Franklin Prime Cheeseman attended Yale University and died in 1918. Samuel Cheeseman died on September 19, 1942, in Slippery Rock, Pennsylvania.
