= John Cheesman =

- Born: 1598; England
- Died: 1665 (aged 66–67); Surrey, England
- Occupations: Merchant, politician

John Cheesman (born ca 1598, died by 1665) was an English merchant and politician who settled in Virginia in the 1620s. Like many from this period in time, Cheesman's surname was spelled in multiple different fashions, which included "Chisman" and "Cheaseman", and "Cheasman". During his time in Virginia Cheeseman served on the Virginia House of Burgesses and the Governor's council.

Little is known about Cheeseman's early life but it is believed that he was born around 1598, in England. He traveled to Virginia in 1621 (aboard the ship, Flying Hart) and settled in what eventually became Elizabeth City County, Virginia. Historical records show that Cheeseman was likely the same John Cheeseman that married Anne Willett in 1616 and it is known that he took a wife named Margaret, with whom they had at least one child.

While in Virginia Cheeseman acquired multiple acres of land and built a plantation. He was appointed a county justice and was made a captain of the militia. By April 1652 he was appointed lieutenant colonel. Cheeseman was also appointed to the House of Burgesses and was present at the first meeting that the burgesses and Council members met separately on March 2, 1643.

Cheeseman eventually returned to England, where he and his wife lived in Surrey. His exact date of death is unknown, but Cheeseman wrote a new will in December 1663 and on May 2, 1665 his will was proved valid in the prerogative court of Canterbury.
