= Dave Cheeseman =

Dave Chesseman
- Birth name: David James Cheeseman
- Born: 24 June 1978 (age 46); Hull, England
- Genres: Rock
- Occupation: Session musician
- Instrument: Keyboards

Dave Cheeseman (born David James Cheeseman, 24 June 1978, Hull, England) is a prolific English underground session musician, known for his work with Sack Trick and Pillow Talk.

== Biography ==
Cheeseman started playing the keyboard after being inspired by Guns N' Roses' live music video of "November Rain", in which frontman Axl Rose can be seen engaging a stadium crowd whilst seated behind a piano. Van Halen and later Dream Theater became the focus of his musical fixations and provided inspiration for his pursuit of keyboard playing perfection.

Cheeseman played keyboards in the York heavy metal outfit Beyond Redemption, with Gideon Letch, Mark Burnett and Evil Clive Jevons, achieving success on the local and underground international metal scene. The band were also notorious for their stage show, which inevitably involved band members stripping to the waist.

Later on, he founded Pillow Talk with James Jirgens, Gideon Letch and Mark Burnett. The band's shambolic comedy rock caught the attention of Chris Dale of Sack Trick, who recruited Cheeseman for his own rock outfit.

In the meantime Cheeseman played drums for several Nottingham based indie bands including the underground folk rockers, Heroic Trio. He also plays bass guitar in a tribute band, Beyond Comprehension.

Cheeseman also plays for Twin Zero, a Reuben Gotto rock project based in London.

Cheeseman is also a Hull City A.F.C. supporter and is regularly seen at the KC Stadium.

== Bands ==
=== Beyond Redemption ===
1997 - 2000

- Dave Cheeseman - Keyboards, Vocals
- Clive Jevons - Guitar, Vocals
- Mark Burnett - Bass Guitar
- Yvgeni Vatchkov - Bass Guitar
- Gideon Letch - Drums

=== Beyond Comprehension ===
1998–Present

- Dave Cheeseman - Bass
- Gideon Letch - Vocals
- Rock God - Guitar
- Oliver Robinson - Crew

=== Pillow Talk ===
1999–Present

- Dave Cheeseman - Keyboards, Vocals
- James Jirgens - Guitar, Vocals
- Mark Burnett - Bass
- Chris Harter - Bass, Vocals
- Dr Roland Parker - Bass
- Ned Potter - Drums
- Chris Smith - Drums
- Gideon Letch - Drums, Vocals
- Ben Calvert - Drums

=== Fat Digester ===
- Dave Cheeseman - Keyboards

=== Heroic Trio ===
1999–Present

- Dave Cheeseman - Drums
- Nicola Underdown - Bass, Vocals
- Sarah Moore - Guitar, Vocals

=== The Deltarays ===
- Dave Cheeseman - Drums
- Dan Hardy - guitar
- Darren Hardy - Bass
- Chris Tomlinson - Vocals
- Glen Davies - Drums

=== Twin Zero ===
2004–Present

- Dave Cheeseman - Keyboards
- Anf Morfitt - Bass
- Reuben Gotto - Guitar
- Karl Middleton- Vocals
- Bing Bong - Guitar
- Ben Calvert - Drums
- Si Hutchby - Drums

=== Sack Trick ===
1997–Present

- Chris Dale - Bass, Vocals
- Reuben Gotto - Guitar, Vocals
- Robin Guy - Drums, Vocals
- Dave Cheeseman - Keyboards, Vocals

== Selected discography ==
- Beyond Redemption - Injury Time EP (2001)
- Pillow Talk - Purely Platonic (2001)
- Smooth Cheeseboard - Paprika Gentlemen (2002) - Solo project with Chris Smith
- Pillow Talk - Painful Love (2003)
- Pillow Talk - Criminal Conviction (2005)
- Twin Zero - Monolith (2005)
- Pillow Talk - "Come On England" (2006) - Single for the 2006 FIFA World Cup
- Twin Zero - The Tomb To Every Hope (2006)
- Sack Trick - Live in Tokyo (2008)
