= Thomas Cheesman (engraver) =

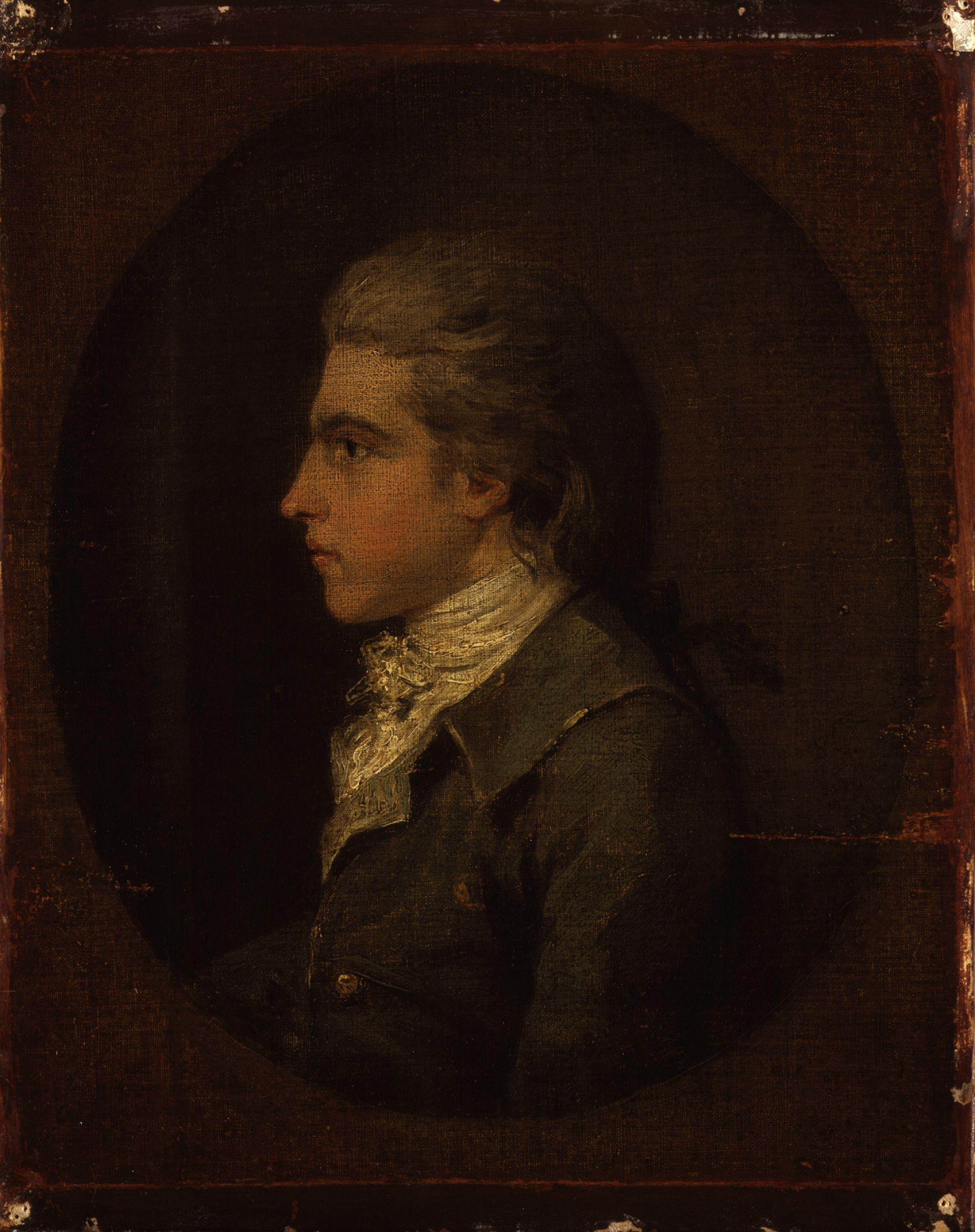
Thomas Cheesman (c. 1777) attributed to Francesco Bartolozzi

Thomas Cheesman (1760–1834) was a British engraver who worked in London. He was a student of the Italian engraver Francesco Bartolozzi, who was working in London at the time.

== Works ==
In 1796, John Trumbull, who had brought a small version of his painting, General George Washington at Trenton, to London in 1794, supervised Cheesman in the engraving George Washington. It was noted by historian Justin Winsor as the best engraving of Trumbull's paintings and was used as the basis for several other engravings.

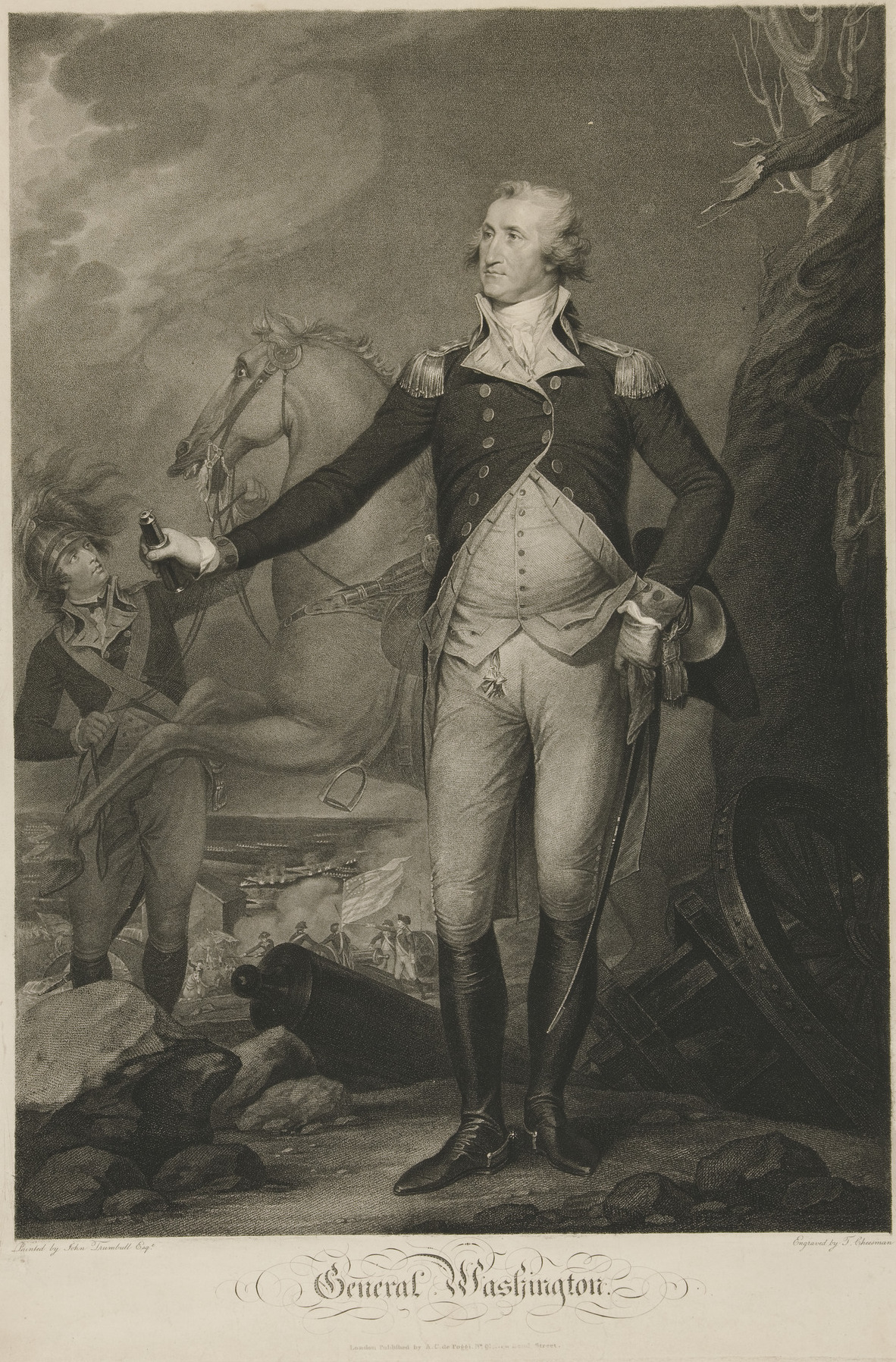
George Washington, engraving after General George Washington at Trenton by John Trumbull, 1796

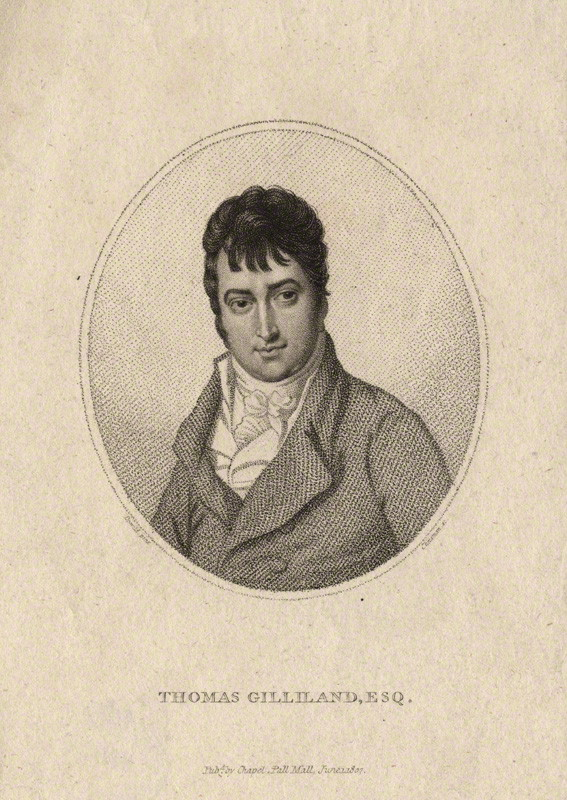
Thomas Gilliland, after Samuel De Wilde, 1807

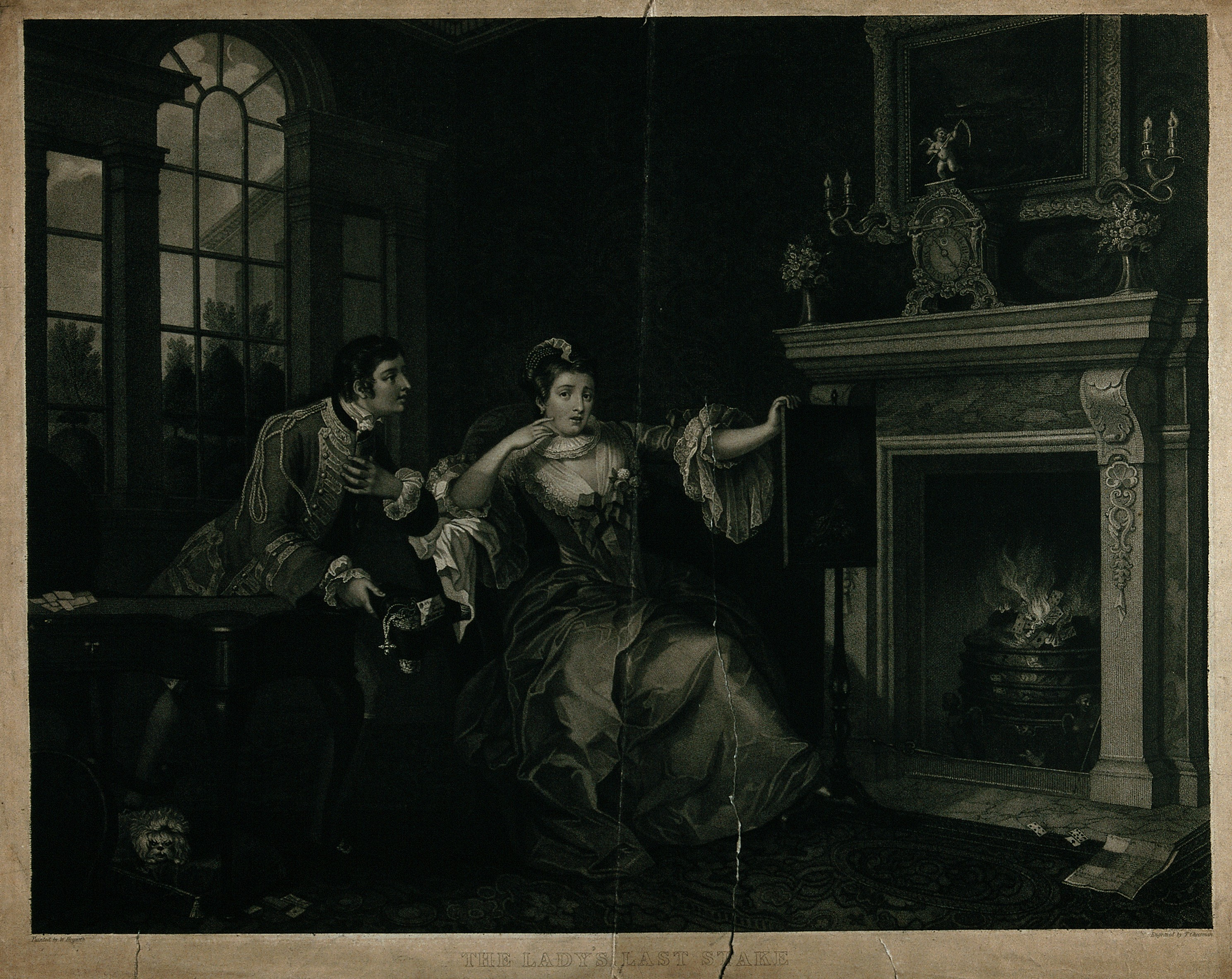
The Lady's Last Stake, engraving after William Hogarth, 1825
