= Emma Cheeseman =

New Zealand painter and taxidermist (1846–1928)

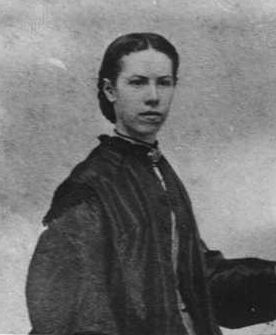
- Cheeseman, date unknown
- Born: 4 November 1846; England
- Died: 2 October 1928 (aged 81); Remuera
- Occupation(s): Taxidermist, scientific illustrator

Emma Cheeseman (4 November 1846 – 2 October 1928) was a painter and taxidermist from England who emigrated to New Zealand as a child. Her work is held in the collection of Auckland War Memorial Museum.

== Biography ==
Cheeseman was born in England in 1846 and emigrated to New Zealand with her family, arriving in Auckland on 4 April 1854 on the Artemesia. Her father was Thomas Cheeseman, a Methodist minister who moved the family to New Zealand in the hope that the climate would cure a throat ailment he suffered from. She had four siblings: two brothers, William and Thomas, and two sisters, Ellen and Clara.

Cheeseman drew and painted specimens for the Auckland Museum, where her brother Thomas was the curator. She also learnt the art of taxidermy and prepared and mounted animal specimens for the museum, particularly birds, at home.

Cheeseman died at her home in the Auckland suburb of Remuera on 2 October 1928, and was buried at Purewa Cemetery.

In 2017, Cheeseman was selected as one of the Royal Society of New Zealand's "150 women in 150 words", celebrating the contributions of women to knowledge in New Zealand.
