= Thomas Cheesman (cricketer) =

English cricketer

Thomas Cheesman (Note: Cheesman's name is spelled Cheesman by Moore as well as both CricInfo and CricketArchive. Derek Carlaw spells it Cheeseman.) (1816 – 15 August 1874) was an English amateur cricketer who played in one first-class cricket match for Kent County Cricket Club in 1854.

Cheesman was born in Luddesdown in Kent in 1816, one of seven children of William and Henrietta Cheesman. He worked as a solicitor in Gravesend and played most of his cricket in the town, including for Gravesend Cricket Club between 1840 and around 1863. His only first-class appearance was at the town's Bat and Ball Ground in 1854 against a United England Eleven, one of fifteen players on the Kent team. (Note: An "odds match" with unmatched teams, this match is not considered first-class by Kent County Cricket Club, but is recognised as such by other authorities. The Kent team was named "XV Young Players of Kent", although it featured a number of players who were not considered "young", including several of Kent's strongest team. It is considered notable as the United Eleven, playing with eleven players against Kent's 15, scored 279 for the loss of 8 wickets in the match's fourth inning to win – a score considered "remarkable" at the time.) Cheesman opened the batting for Kent and scored 14 runs in his first innings but was out for a duck in Kent's second innings. He is also known to have played in minor matches for Gentlemen of Kent teams.

Cheesman is not believed to have married. He died at Margate in 1874.

== Bibliography ==
- Carlaw, Derek (2020). Kent County Cricketers, A to Z: Part One (1806–1914) (PDF). Cardiff: ACS.
