= Thomas Cheeseman =

English-born New Zealand botanist (1846–1923)

Thomas Cheeseman FLS FZS FNZInst.
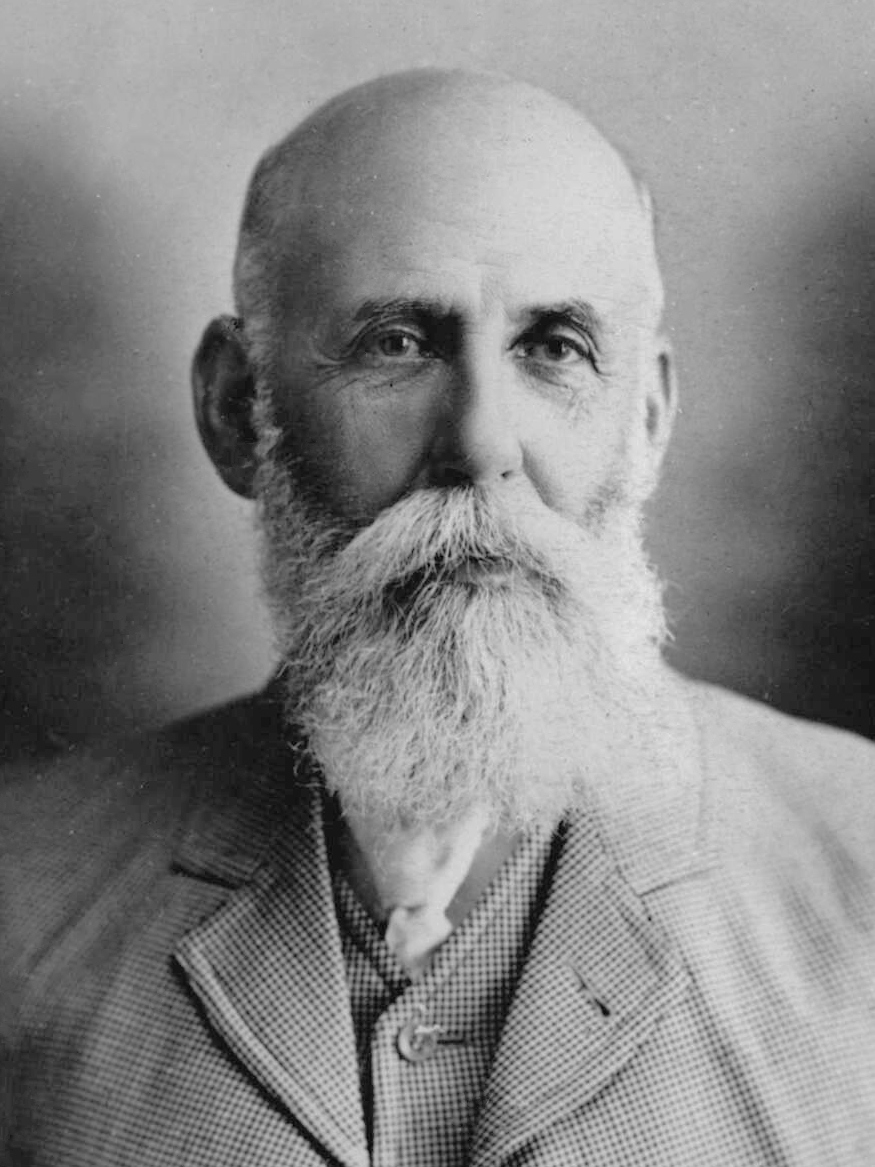
- Cheeseman c. 1910s
- Born: Thomas Frederick Cheeseman; 8 June 1845; Hull, Yorkshire, England
- Died: 15 October 1923 (aged 77); Auckland, New Zealand
- Education: Parnell Grammar School; St John's College
- Spouse: Rosetta "Rose" Keesing (m. 1889)
- Children: 2
- Awards: Hector Memorial Medal; Linnean Medal
- Scientific career
- Fields: Botany
- Institutions: Auckland Museum
- Author abbrev. (botany): Cheeseman
- Relatives: William Joseph Cheeseman (brother); Clara Cheeseman (sister); Ellen Cheeseman (sister); Emma Cheeseman (sister)

Signature
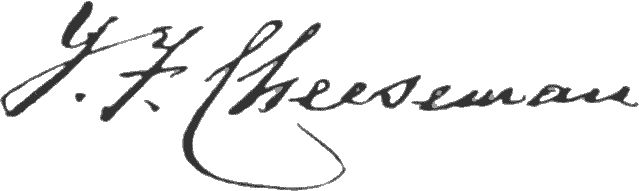

Thomas Frederick Cheeseman FLS FZS FNZInst. (8 June 1845 – 15 October 1923) was a New Zealand botanist. He was also a naturalist who had wide-ranging interests, such that he even described a few species of sea slugs (marine gastropod molluscs).

== Biography ==
Cheeseman was born at Hull, in Yorkshire on 8 June 1845, the eldest of five children. He came to New Zealand at the age of eight with his parents on the Artemesia, arriving in Auckland on 4 April 1854. He was educated at Parnell Grammar School and then at St John's College, Auckland. His father, the Rev. Thomas Cheeseman, had been a member of the old Auckland Provincial Council.

Cheeseman started studying the flora of New Zealand, and in 1872 he published an accurate and comprehensive account of the plant life of the Waitākere Ranges. In 1874, he was appointed Secretary of the Auckland Institute and Curator of the Auckland Museum, which had only recently been founded. For the first three decades, Cheeseman was the only staff member who worked at the museum, other than the museum's janitor. Under his curatorship, the museum's collections were formed. His botanical studies were valuable not just academically, but were of importance to agriculture, horticulture, and forestry. He published papers almost every year until his death.

When Cheeseman's research began, the botany of New Zealand was quite poorly known. Cheeseman made many collecting trips including areas such as the Nelson Provincial District, the Kermadec and Three Kings Islands, and the area from Mangōnui to the far north. He sometimes travelled with his friend Mr. J. Adams, of the Thames High School, after whom he named the species Senecio adamsii and Elytranthe adamsii.

Cheeseman also visited Polynesia. He published in the Transactions of the Linnean Society a full account of the flora of Rarotonga, the chief island of the Cook Islands.

Hundreds of bird specimens added to Auckland Museum's collections by Cheeseman were shot by his younger brother, William Joseph, and their labels bear the tag "W.J.C." The museum could not afford a taxidermist, but Cheeseman's sister Emma learnt the skill and prepared many of the specimens. Her initials "E.C." appear.on the backs of many labels. His two other sisters, Ellen, a watercolour painter and botanist, and Clara, a novelist, also accompanied him on field trips.

Cheeseman married Rosetta Keesing, of a notable Jewish family of Auckland city, in November 1889. Together, they had two children: Dorothy (later Dorothy Grant-Taylor) and Guy. Cheeseman died on 15 October 1923. Cheeseman's archives are held at the Auckland Museum.

== Bibliography ==
Out of his 101 papers and books, twenty-two are on zoological or ethnological subjects, as opposed to botany.

Many of Cheeseman's botanical publications paved the way for the publication of a complete Flora of New Zealand. In 1906 he produced the Manual of the New Zealand Flora, illustrated by his sister Clara Cheeseman. In 1914 he, Hemsley, and Matilda Smith created Illustrations of the New Zealand Flora (1914). In some of his publications, Cheeseman speculated as to the possible origins of the New Zealand sub-Antarctic flora. He also had written an early paper on the naturalised plants of the Auckland Provincial District. Some of his early papers were about the pollination of certain species.

As well as his botanical research, Cheeseman developed the Auckland Museum, including what is probably the most extensive collection extant illustrating Māori ethnology. He donated his own herbarium of the flowering plants and vascular cryptogams to the Auckland Institute.

He published 83 articles in the Transactions of the Royal Society of New Zealand.

Cheeseman also named ten sea snails, half of which have become synonyms. Eight marine species were named cheesemanii after him.

== Membership ==
Cheeseman was a Fellow of the Linnean Society of London (FLS), and the Zoological Society (FZS). He was made a Corresponding Membership of the Botanical Society of Edinburgh, and awarded the Gold Linnean Medal of the Linnean Society, the botanical equivalent to a Nobel Medal, in 1923.

He served as the President of the New Zealand Institute from 1911 to 1913. In 1918, he was awarded the Hector Memorial Medal and Prize, and in 1919 he was made an original Fellow of the New Zealand Institute (FNZInst.).
