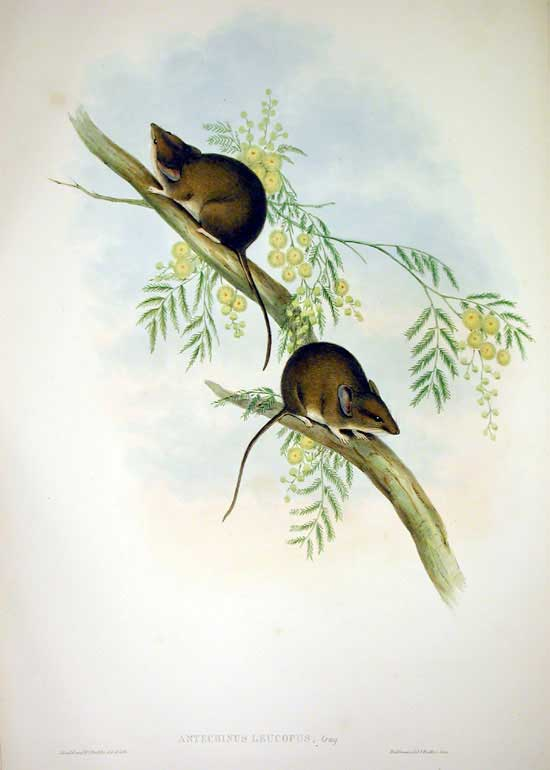
- Sminthopsis leucopus

Scientific classification
- Kingdom: Animalia
- Phylum: Chordata
- Class: Mammalia
- Infraclass: Marsupialia
- Order: Dasyuromorphia
- Family: Dasyuridae
- Subfamily: Sminthopsinae; Archer, 1982

Tribes and genera
- Sminthopsini: Antechinomys; Ningaui; Sminthopsis; Planigalini: Planigale

= Sminthopsinae =

Subfamily of marsupials

The subfamily Sminthopsinae includes several genera of small, carnivorous marsupials native to Australia: kultarrs, ningauis, dunnarts, and planigales.

== Classification ==
- Subfamily Sminthopsinae
  - Tribe Sminthopsini
    - Genus Antechinomys
      - Kultarr, Antechinomys laniger
    - Genus Ningaui
      - Wongai ningaui, Ningaui ridei
      - Pilbara ningaui, Ningaui timealeyi
      - Southern ningaui, Ningaui yvonnae
    - Genus Sminthopsis
      - S. crassicaudata species-group
        - Fat-tailed dunnart, Sminthopsis crassicaudata
      - S. macroura species-group
        - Kakadu dunnart, Sminthopsis bindi
        - Carpentarian dunnart, Sminthopsis butleri
        - Julia Creek dunnart, Sminthopsis douglasi
        - Stripe-faced dunnart, Sminthopsis macroura
        - Red-cheeked dunnart, Sminthopsis virginiae
      - S. granulipes species-group
        - White-tailed dunnart, Sminthopsis granulipes
      - S. griseoventer species-group
        - Kangaroo Island dunnart, Sminthopsis aitkeni
        - Boullanger Island dunnart, Sminthopsis boullangerensis
        - Grey-bellied dunnart, Sminthopsis griseoventer
      - S. longicaudata species-group
        - Long-tailed dunnart, Sminthopsis longicaudata
      - S. murina species-group
        - Chestnut dunnart, Sminthopsis archeri
        - Little long-tailed dunnart, Sminthopsis dolichura
        - Sooty dunnart, Sminthopsis fulginosus
        - Gilbert's dunnart, Sminthopsis gilberti
        - White-footed dunnart, Sminthopsis leucopus
        - Slender-tailed dunnart, Sminthopsis murina
      - S. psammophila species-group
        - Hairy-footed dunnart, Sminthopsis hirtipes
        - Ooldea dunnart, Sminthopsis ooldea
        - Sandhill dunnart, Sminthopsis psammophila
        - Lesser hairy-footed dunnart, Sminthopsis youngsoni
  - Tribe Planigalini
    - Genus Planigale
      - Paucident planigale, Planigale gilesi
      - Long-tailed planigale, Planigale ingrami
      - Common planigale, Planigale maculata
      - New Guinean planigale, Planigale novaeguineae
      - Narrow-nosed planigale, Planigale tenuirostris
