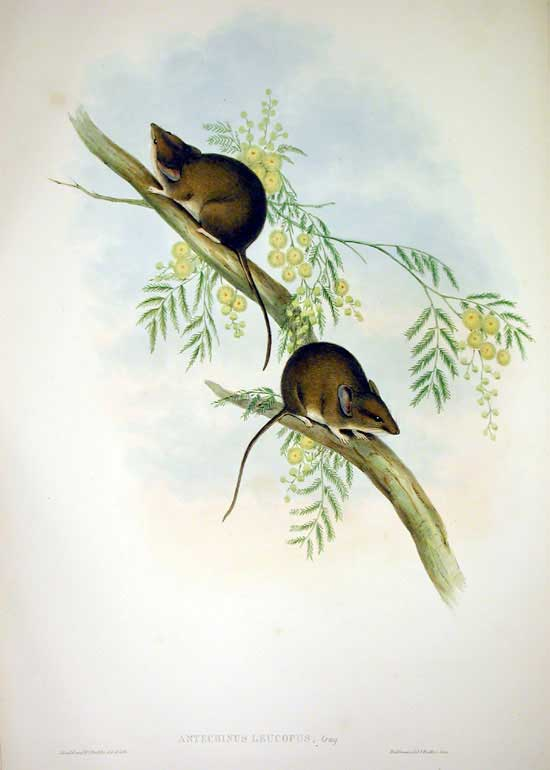
- Sminthopsis leucopus

Scientific classification
- Kingdom: Animalia
- Phylum: Chordata
- Class: Mammalia
- Infraclass: Marsupialia
- Order: Dasyuromorphia
- Family: Dasyuridae
- Subfamily: Sminthopsinae
- Tribe: Sminthopsini; Archer, 1982

Genera
- Antechinomys; Ningaui; Sminthopsis

= Sminthopsini =

Tribe of marsupials

Smintopsini is a tribe of marsupial in the family Dasyuridae.

== Classification ==
- Tribe Sminthopsini
  - Genus Antechinomys
    - Kultarr, Antechinomys laniger
  - Genus Ningaui
    - Wongai ningaui, Ningaui ridei
    - Pilbara ningaui, Ningaui timealeyi
    - Southern ningaui, Ningaui yvonnae
  - Genus Sminthopsis
    - S. crassicaudata species-group
      - Fat-tailed dunnart, Sminthopsis crassicaudata
    - S. macroura species-group
      - Kakadu dunnart, Sminthopsis bindi
      - Carpentarian dunnart, Sminthopsis butleri
      - Julia Creek dunnart, Sminthopsis douglasi
      - Stripe-faced dunnart, Sminthopsis macroura
      - Red-cheeked dunnart, Sminthopsis virginiae
    - S. granulipes species-group
      - White-tailed dunnart, Sminthopsis granulipes
    - S. griseoventer species-group
      - Kangaroo Island dunnart, Sminthopsis aitkeni
      - Boullanger Island dunnart, Sminthopsis boullangerensis
      - Grey-bellied dunnart, Sminthopsis griseoventer
    - S. longicaudata species-group
      - Long-tailed dunnart, Sminthopsis longicaudata
    - S. murina species-group
      - Chestnut dunnart, Sminthopsis archeri
      - Little long-tailed dunnart, Sminthopsis dolichura
      - Sooty dunnart, Sminthopsis fulginosus
      - Gilbert's dunnart, Sminthopsis gilberti
      - White-footed dunnart, Sminthopsis leucopus
      - Slender-tailed dunnart, Sminthopsis murina
    - S. psammophila species-group
      - Hairy-footed dunnart, Sminthopsis hirtipes
      - Ooldea dunnart, Sminthopsis ooldea
      - Sandhill dunnart, Sminthopsis psammophila
      - Lesser hairy-footed dunnart, Sminthopsis youngsoni
