= Boullanger Island dunnart =

Scientific classification
- Domain: Eukaryota
- Kingdom: Animalia
- Phylum: Chordata
- Class: Mammalia
- Infraclass: Marsupialia
- Order: Dasyuromorphia
- Family: Dasyuridae
- Genus: Sminthopsis
- Species: S. boullangerensis

Binomial name
- Sminthopsis boullangerensis Crowther, Dickman & Lynam, 1999

Species of mammal

The Boullanger Island dunnart (Sminthopsis boullangerensis) is a species of dunnart found only on Boullanger Island, Western Australia. It was formerly considered a subspecies of the grey-bellied dunnart (S. griseoventer), for which reason it was not assessed by the IUCN in 2008 (although it was classed as critically endangered in the 1996 list). The EPBC Act classifies the Boullanger Island dunnart as vulnerable.

== See also ==
- Boullanger Island
