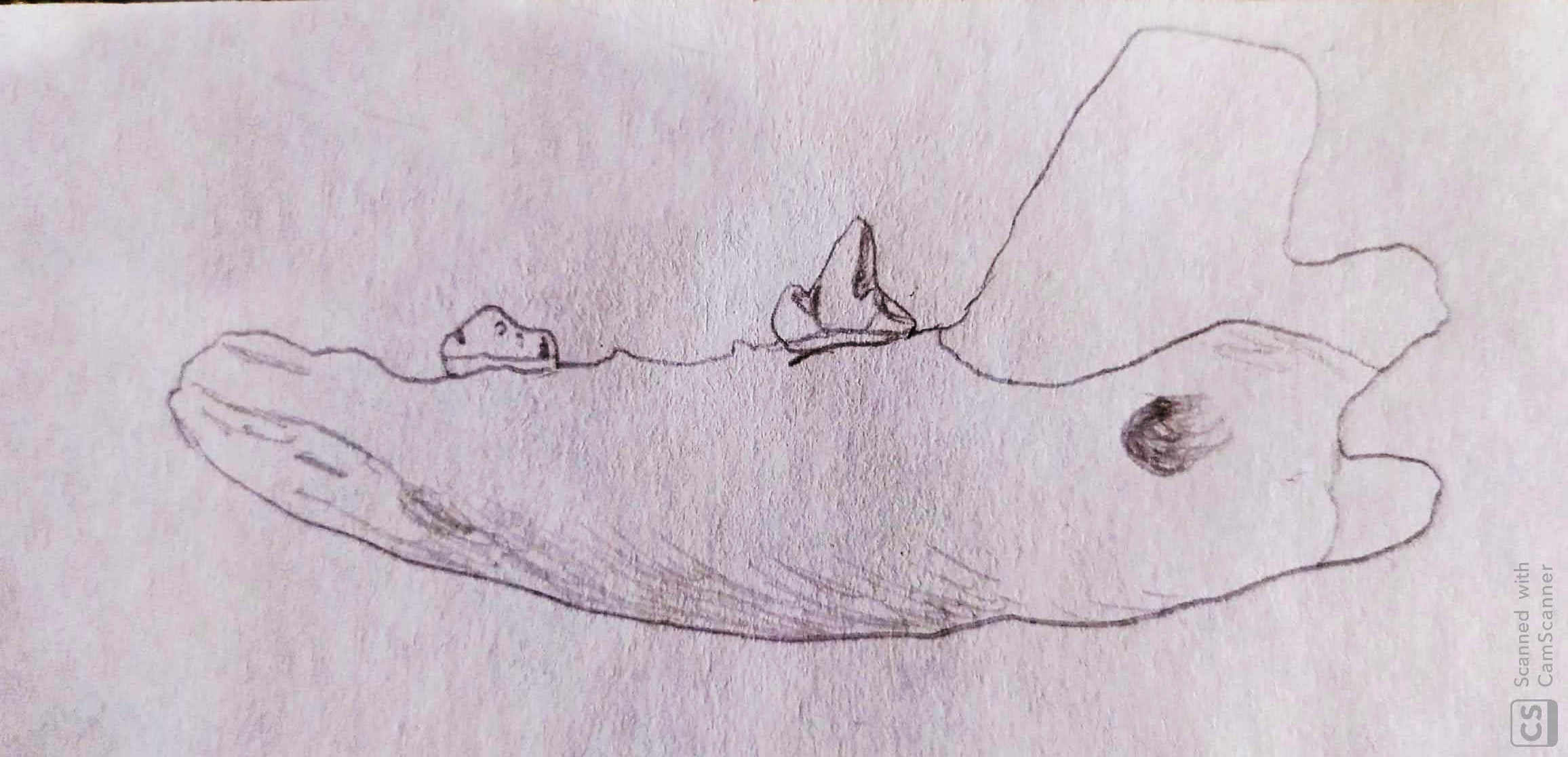

Scientific classification
- Domain: Eukaryota
- Kingdom: Animalia
- Phylum: Chordata
- Class: Mammalia
- Infraclass: Marsupialia
- Order: Dasyuromorphia
- Family: Dasyuridae
- Genus: †Glaucodon; Stirton, 1957
- Species: †G. ballaratensis

Binomial name
- †Glaucodon ballaratensis Stirton, 1957

= Glaucodon =

Glaucodon Temporal range: Late Pliocene

Extinct genus of marsupials

Glaucodon is an extinct genus of marsupial from Australia.
