= Grey-bellied dunnart =

Conservation status
- Least Concern (IUCN 3.1)

Scientific classification
- Kingdom: Animalia
- Phylum: Chordata
- Class: Mammalia
- Infraclass: Marsupialia
- Order: Dasyuromorphia
- Family: Dasyuridae
- Genus: Sminthopsis
- Species: S. griseoventor

Binomial name
- Sminthopsis griseoventor (Kitchener, Stoddart & Henry, 1984)
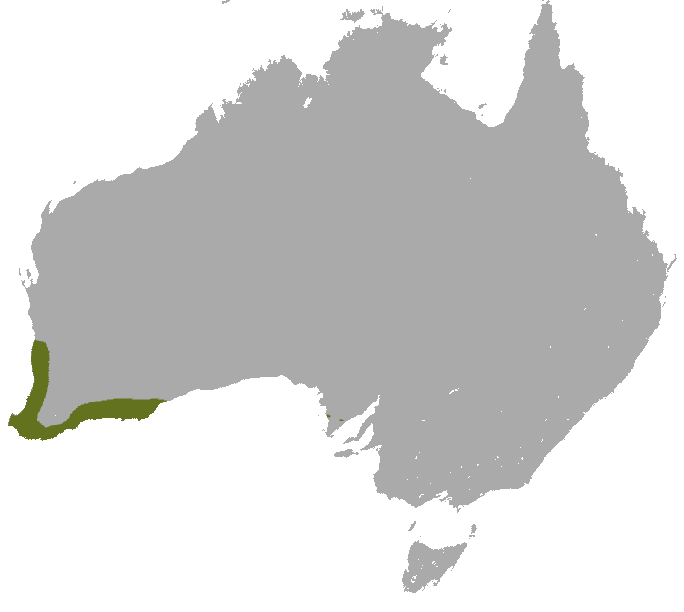
- Grey-bellied dunnart range

Species of marsupial

The grey-bellied dunnart (Sminthopsis griseoventer), alternately spelled gray-bellied dunnart, was described by Kitchener, Stoddart and Henry along with the Kangaroo Island dunnart, Gilbert's dunnart and little long-tailed dunnart in 1984. They also described the Mallee ningaui in 1983.

The average body length of a specimen can vary between 130–192 mm with a tail of 65–98 mm and body to anus of 65–95 mm. The olive grey ears have a length of between 17–18 mm. The hind feet have an average length of between 16–17 mm. Its weight varies between 15-25 grams.

== Distribution and habitat ==
Found in Western Australia on the coastal south west fringes and associated ranges. From north to south then to east, Gairdner Ranges to Cape Arid National Park, its habitat rarely stretches 100 km (62 mi) inland from the coast. A population was discovered in December 2003 in South Australia during a Department for Environment and Heritage Biological Survey on Eyre Peninsula in the Hincks and Bascombe Well conservation parks. Habitat includes heathy forests, woodland, melaleuca swamplands dense mature heathland. No subspecies is identified.

== Social organisation and breeding ==
They are nocturnal and inhabit leaf litter and burrows. Breeding is done in a nest below ground a few centimetres, with 8 born in August for Boulenger Island and October of other areas. Only 1 litter is born.

== Diet ==
This dunnart is a nocturnal omnivorous marsupial that eats insects, small mammals, reptiles and amphibians as well as soft fruit.
