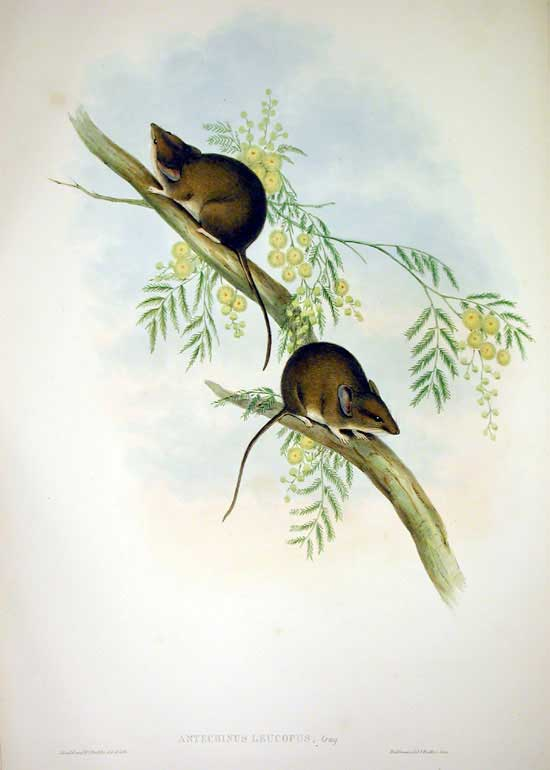
- White-footed dunnart (Sminthopsis leucopus)

Scientific classification
- Kingdom: Animalia
- Phylum: Chordata
- Class: Mammalia
- Infraclass: Marsupialia
- Order: Dasyuromorphia
- Family: Dasyuridae
- Subfamily: Sminthopsinae
- Tribe: Sminthopsini
- Genus: Sminthopsis; Thomas, 1887

Type species
- Phascogale crassicaudata Gould, 1844

Species
- 23, see text

= Dunnart =

Genus of mammals (Sminthopsis; marsupials)

A dunnart (from Noongar donat) is a narrow-footed marsupial the size of a European mouse, of the genus Sminthopsis. Dunnarts have a largely insectivorous diet.

== Taxonomy ==
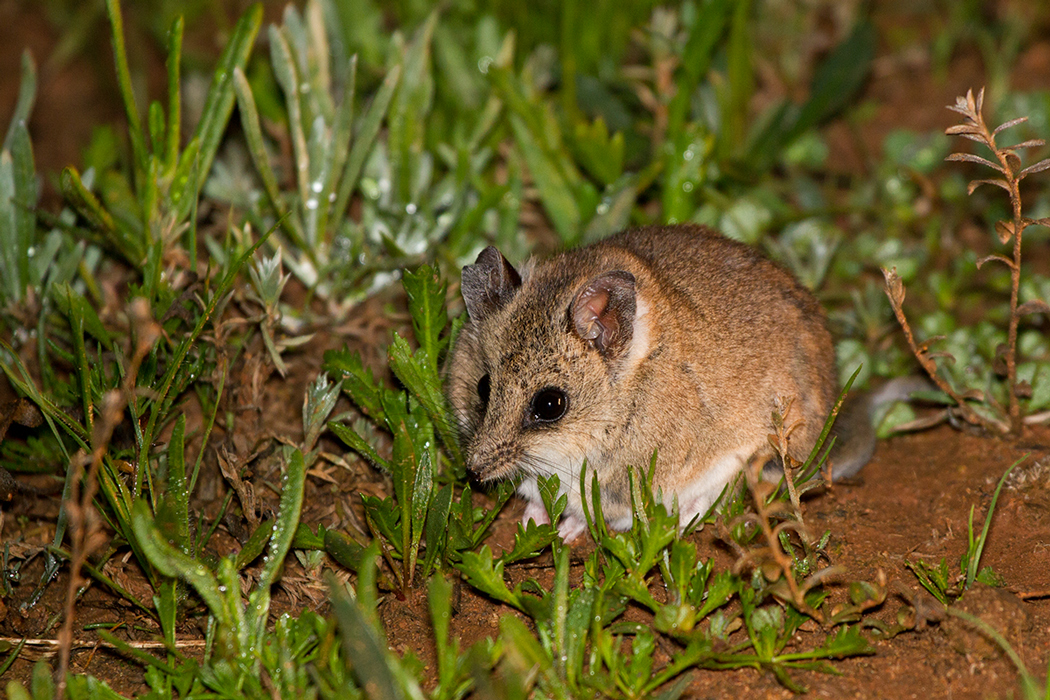
Fat-tailed dunnart in its natural habitat.

The genus name Sminthopsis was published by Oldfield Thomas in 1887, the author noting that the name Podabrus that had previously been used to describe the species was preoccupied as a genus of beetles. The type species is Phascogale crassicaudata, published by John Gould in 1844.

There are 19 species, (Note: The list is based on the Third edition of Wilson & Reeder's Mammal Species of the World (2005) except where both the Mammal Diversity Database and IUCN agree on the change.) all of them in Australia or New Guinea:

- Genus Sminthopsis
  - S. crassicaudata species-group
    - Fat-tailed dunnart, Sminthopsis crassicaudata
  - S. macroura species-group
    - Kakadu dunnart, Sminthopsis bindi
    - Carpentarian dunnart, Sminthopsis butleri
    - Julia Creek dunnart, Sminthopsis douglasi
    - Stripe-faced dunnart, Sminthopsis macroura
    - Red-cheeked dunnart, Sminthopsis virginiae
  - S. granulipes species-group
    - White-tailed dunnart, Sminthopsis granulipes
  - S. griseoventer species-group
    - Grey-bellied dunnart, Sminthopsis griseoventer
  - S. murina species-group
    - Kangaroo Island dunnart, Sminthopsis aitkeni
    - Chestnut dunnart, Sminthopsis archeri
    - Little long-tailed dunnart, Sminthopsis dolichura
    - Sooty dunnart, Sminthopsis fuliginosus
    - Gilbert's dunnart, Sminthopsis gilberti
    - White-footed dunnart, Sminthopsis leucopus
    - Slender-tailed dunnart, Sminthopsis murina
  - S. psammophila species-group
    - Hairy-footed dunnart, Sminthopsis hirtipes
    - Ooldea dunnart, Sminthopsis ooldea
    - Sandhill dunnart, Sminthopsis psammophila
    - Lesser hairy-footed dunnart, Sminthopsis youngsoni

Additionally, three species are recognized by the American Society of Mammalogists:

- Froggatt's dunnart, Sminthopsis froggatti
- Stalker's dunnart, Sminthopsis stalkeri
- Western Red-cheeked Dunnart, Sminthopsis nitela

The American Society of Mammalogists also lists S. griseoventer as a synonym of S. fuliginosa, and moved S. longicaudata to the genus Antechinomys.

== Description ==
A male dunnart's Y chromosome is the smallest known mammalian Y chromosome.
