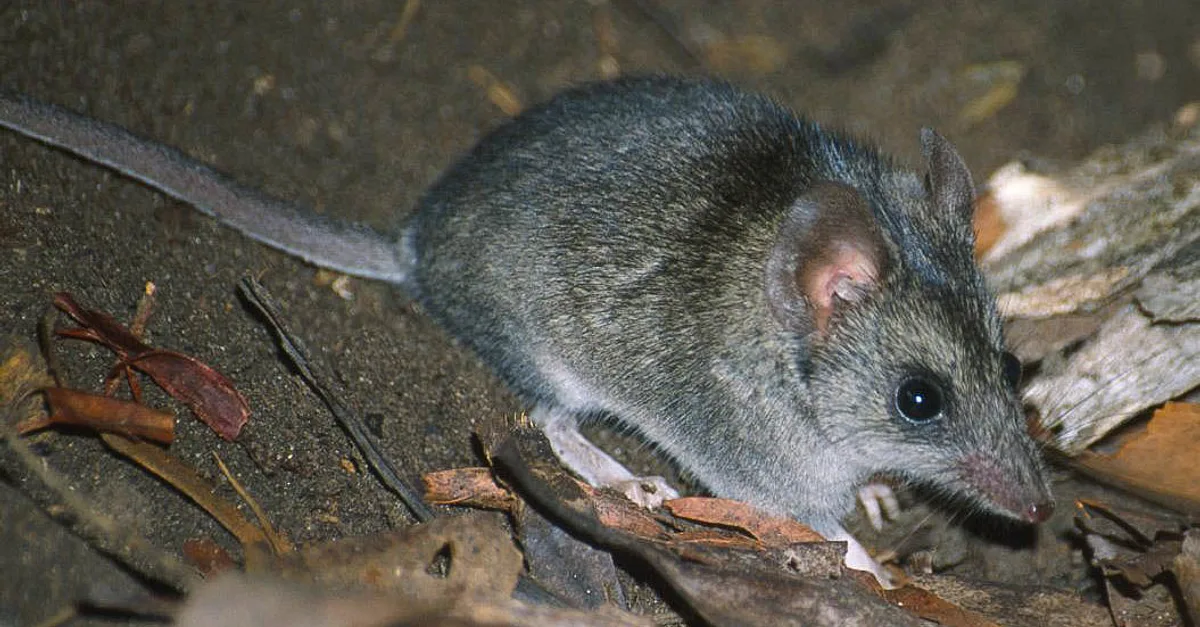

Conservation status
- Least Concern (IUCN 3.1)

Scientific classification
- Kingdom: Animalia
- Phylum: Chordata
- Class: Mammalia
- Infraclass: Marsupialia
- Order: Dasyuromorphia
- Family: Dasyuridae
- Genus: Sminthopsis
- Species: S. fuliginosus

Binomial name
- Sminthopsis fuliginosus (Gould, 1852)
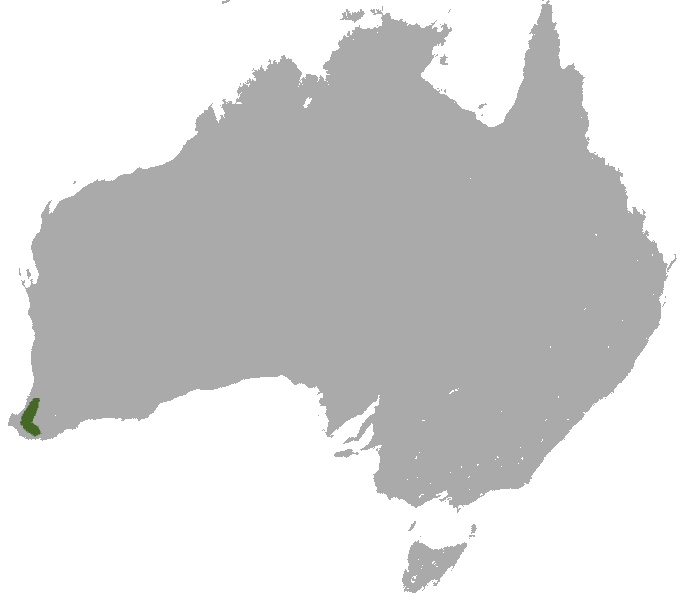
- Sooty dunnart range

= Sooty dunnart =

Species of marsupial

The sooty dunnart (Sminthopsis fuliginosus) is a species of dunnart found in Western Australia. It is one of the least-known of the dunnarts, with the IUCN classifying it as least concern. It was formerly believed to be a subspecies of the common dunnart (S. murina).
