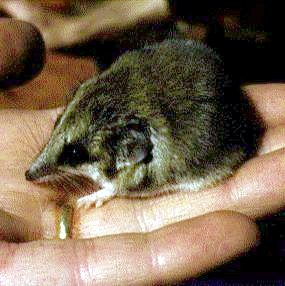

Conservation status
- Least Concern (IUCN 3.1)

Scientific classification
- Kingdom: Animalia
- Phylum: Chordata
- Class: Mammalia
- Infraclass: Marsupialia
- Order: Dasyuromorphia
- Family: Dasyuridae
- Genus: Sminthopsis
- Species: S. youngsoni

Binomial name
- Sminthopsis youngsoni McKenzie & Archer, 1982
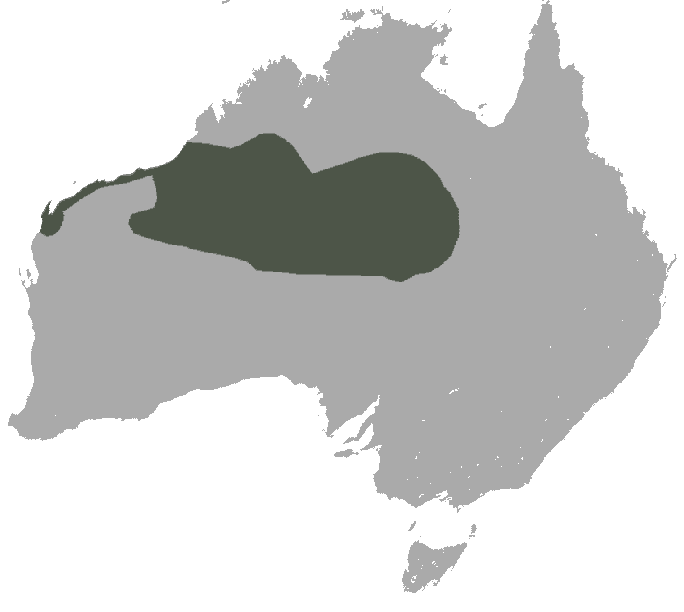
- Lesser hairy-footed dunnart range

= Lesser hairy-footed dunnart =

Species of marsupial

The lesser hairy-footed dunnart (Sminthopsis youngsoni) is a small carnivorous Australian marsupial of the family Dasyuridae. It is a widespread and fairly common species, being found in many desert areas of Western Australia, Northern Territory and Queensland. Its foraging strategies have been studied by Haythornthwaite and Dickman.

The lesser hairy-footed dunnart is distinguished from the very similar hairy-footed dunnart by its smaller size and less hairy soles.

== Population dynamics ==
During dry periods, hairy-footed dunnart populations remain stable, instead of experiencing a boom-bust cycle like sandy inland mice.
