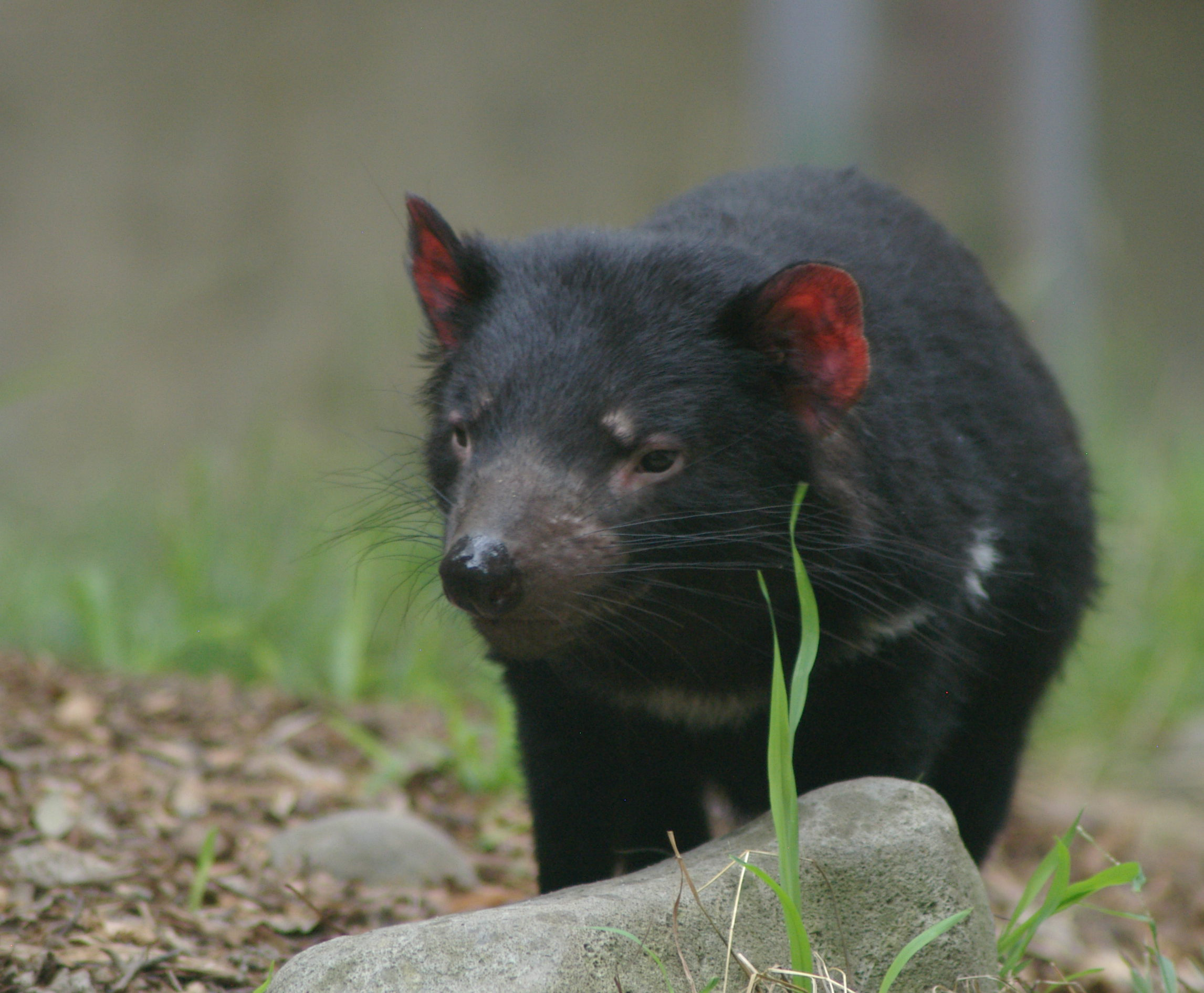
- Tasmanian devil

Scientific classification
- Kingdom: Animalia
- Phylum: Chordata
- Class: Mammalia
- Infraclass: Marsupialia
- Order: Dasyuromorphia
- Family: Dasyuridae; Goldfuss, 1820

Type genus
- Dasyurus Geoffroy, 1796

Subfamilies & tribes
- Dasyurinae: Dasyurini; Phascogalini; Sminthopsinae: Sminthopsini; Planigalini
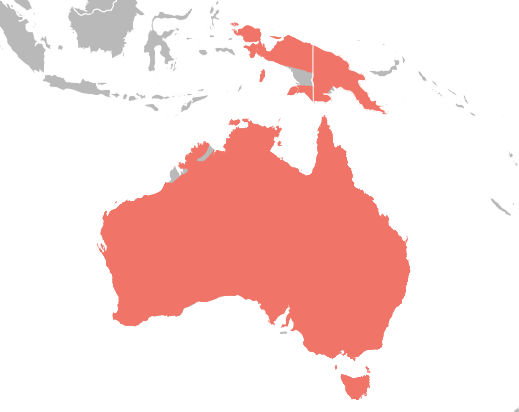
- Dasyuridae distribution

= Dasyuridae =

Dasyurids Temporal range: Oligocene–present

Family of marsupials

The Dasyuridae are a family of marsupials native to Australia and New Guinea, including 71 extant species divided into 17 genera. Many are small and mouse-like or shrew-like, giving some of them the name marsupial mice or marsupial shrews, but the group also includes the cat-sized quolls, as well as the Tasmanian devil. They are found in a wide range of habitats, including grassland, underground, forests, and mountains. Some species are arboreal or semiaquatic. The Dasyuridae are often called the 'marsupial carnivores', as most members of the family are insectivores.

== Characteristics ==
Most dasyurids are roughly the size of mice, but a few species are much larger. The smallest species is the Pilbara ningaui, which is from 4.6 to 5.7 cm (1.8 to 2.2 in) in length, and weighs just 2 to 9 g (0.07 to 0.3 oz), while the largest, the Tasmanian devil, is 57 to 65 cm (22 to 26 in) long, and weighs from 6 to 8 kg (13 to 18 lb). The smaller dasyurids typically resemble shrews or mice in appearance, with long tails and narrow, pointed noses. The larger species bear a resemblance to such placental carnivores as mongooses or mustelids.

Many features of dasyurids are considered primitive; that is, they resemble the features of the earliest marsupials, from which other species, such as kangaroos and bandicoots, later diverged. For example, all of the toes in dasyurids are separate, whereas in many other marsupials, the second and third toes are fused. Similarly, many species lack a full marsupial pouch, instead having a simple fold of skin surrounding the teats to provide some protection to the developing young. The dentition of dasyurids is also considered primitive, and differs from that of other marsupials, with a dental formula of: 4.1.2-3.43.1.2-3.4. Their dentition is similar to many carnivores, characterized by bladelike incisors, large, sharp canines, and upper molars modified with large, sharp cusps.

Dasyurids are primarily insectivorous, but they will also eat small lizards, fruit, and flowers. One of the few exceptions to this rule is the Tasmanian devil, which subsists mainly on vertebrate carrion. They have relatively simple digestive tracts, as is typical of insectivores and other carnivores.

Gestation lasts from 12 to 16 days, and results in the birth of from two to 12 young, depending on species. Smaller species typically breed at least twice a year, while the larger forms tend to breed just once. The length of lactation reflects this, with young dunnarts, for example, being weaned after 60–70 days, but young quolls only after 8–9 months. Most dasyurid species are sexually mature at one year of age, but, again, the quolls and Tasmanian devil, being larger, take longer to mature and do not reach full adulthood for about two years.

Adult dasyurids are typically solitary, or travel in small groups of two to three individuals.

== Evolution ==
Dasyurids diversified extensively during the Neogene period in both arid and humid habitats, although only taxa adapted to aridity have survived into the present.

In 2026, the discovery of the Early Miocene species Miyumba chrisdickmani from the Riversleigh World Heritage Area in Queensland extended the confirmed fossil record of the family by more than 10 million years. The fossil indicates that dasyurids had already evolved by the Early Miocene, when much of northern Australia was covered by rainforest, providing new insights into the early evolution and historical distribution of the group.

== Taxonomy ==
Cladogram after Álvarez-Carretero et al. 2022:

- - Thylacinidae
    †Thylacinus (thylacine)
  - - Myrmecobiidae
      Myrmecobius (numbat)
    - Dasyuridae
      - Sminthopsinae
        - Planigale
        - - Sminthopsis species-group 1
          - - Ningaui
            - - Antechinomys
              - Sminthopsis species-group 2
          - - Sminthopsis species-group 3
      - Dasyurinae
        - Phascogalini
          - Antechinus
          - - Phascogale
            - Murexia
        - Dasyurini
          - - - Neophascogale
              - Phascolosorex
            - - Dasyurus
              - Sarcophilus
          - - Pseudantechinus
            - - - Dasycercus
                - Dasyuroides
              - - Dasykaluta
                - - Parantechinus
                  - Myoictis

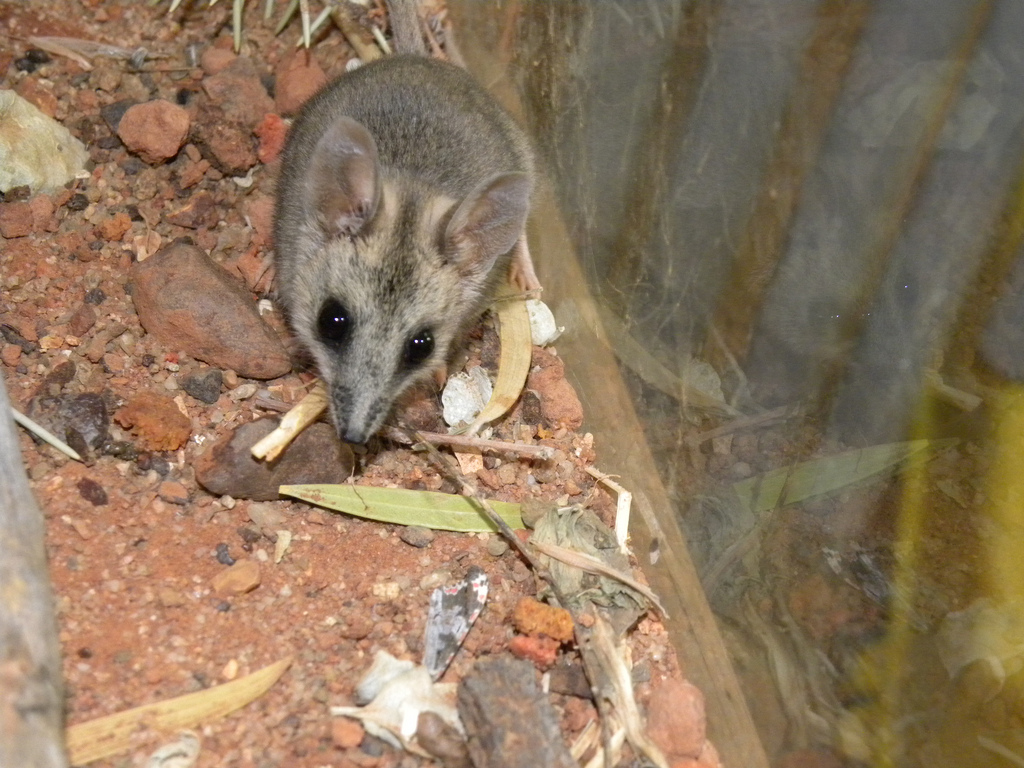
Stripe-faced dunnart

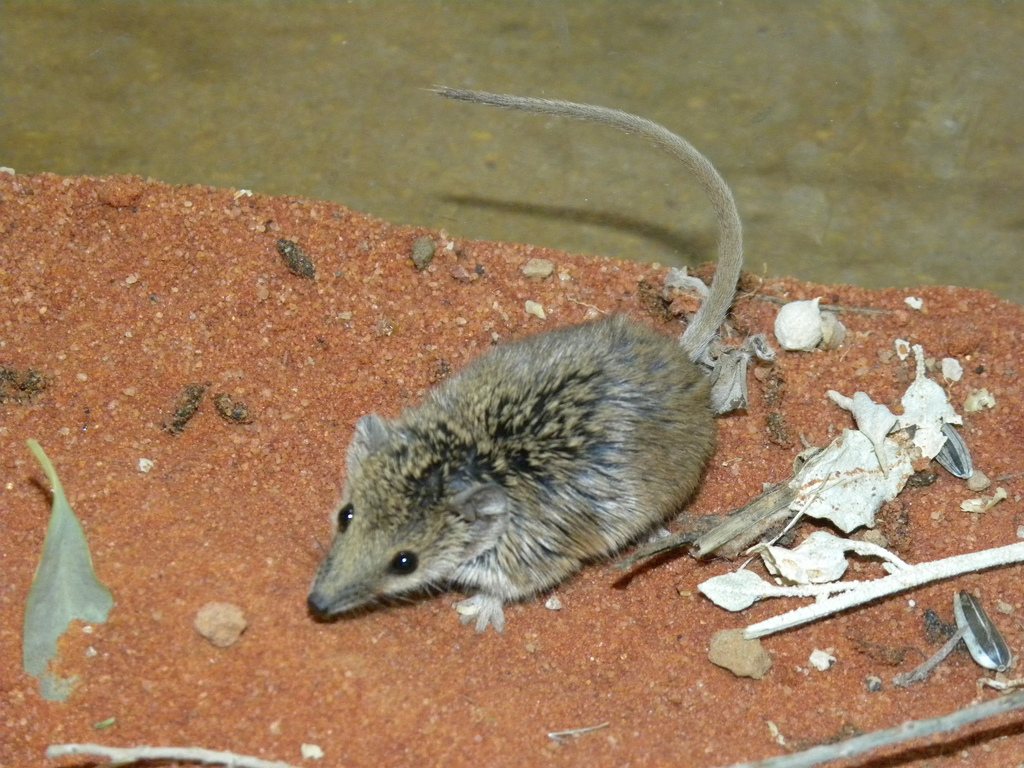
Narrow-nosed planigale

The listing for extant species is based on The Third edition of Wilson & Reeder's Mammal Species of the World (2005), except where the Mammal Diversity Database and IUCN agree on a change.

- Family Dasyuridae
  - Genus †Ganbulanyi
  - Genus †Glaucodon
  - Genus †Urrayira
  - Subfamily †Barinyainae
    - Genus †Barinya
  - Subfamily Dasyurinae
    - Tribe Dasyurini
      - Genus Dasycercus
        - Brush-tailed mulgara, Dasycercus blythi
        - Crest-tailed mulgara, Dasycercus cristicauda
      - Genus Dasykaluta
        - Little red kaluta, Dasykaluta rosamondae
      - Genus Dasyuroides
        - Kowari, Dasyuroides byrnei
      - Genus Dasyurus: quolls
        - New Guinean quoll, Dasyurus albopunctatus
        - Western quoll, Dasyurus geoffroii
        - Northern quoll, Dasyurus hallucatus
        - Tiger quoll, Dasyurus maculatus
        - Bronze quoll, Dasyurus spartacus
        - Eastern quoll, Dasyurus viverrinus
      - Genus Myoictis
        - Woolley's three-striped dasyure, Myoictis leucera
        - Three-striped dasyure, Myoictis melas
        - Wallace's dasyure, Myoictis wallacii
        - Tate's three-striped dasyure, Myoictis wavicus
      - Genus Neophascogale
        - Speckled dasyure, Neophascogale lorentzi
      - Genus Parantechinus
        - Dibbler, Parantechinus apicalis
      - Genus Phascolosorex
        - Red-bellied marsupial shrew, Phascolosorex doriae
        - Narrow-striped marsupial shrew, Phascolosorex dorsalis
      - Genus Pseudantechinus
        - Sandstone false antechinus, Pseudantechinus bilarni
        - Fat-tailed false antechinus, Pseudantechinus macdonnellensis
        - Alexandria false antechinus, Pseudantechinus mimulus
        - Ningbing false antechinus, Pseudantechinus ningbing
        - Rory Cooper's false antechinus, Pseudantechinus roryi
        - Woolley's false antechinus, Pseudantechinus woolleyae
      - Genus Sarcophilus
        - Tasmanian devil, Sarcophilus harrisii
    - Tribe Phascogalini
      - Genus Antechinus
        - Tropical antechinus, Antechinus adustus
        - Agile antechinus, Antechinus agilis
        - Silver-headed antechinus, Antechinus argentis
        - Black-tailed antechinus, Antechinus arktos
        - Fawn antechinus, Antechinus bellus
        - Yellow-footed antechinus, Antechinus flavipes
        - Atherton antechinus, Antechinus godmani
        - Cinnamon antechinus, Antechinus leo
        - Mainland dusky antechinus, Antechinus mimetes
        - Swamp antechinus, Antechinus minimus
        - Buff-footed antechinus, Antechinus mysticus
        - Brown antechinus, Antechinus stuartii
        - Subtropical antechinus, Antechinus subtropicus
        - Tasmanian dusky antechinus, Antechinus swainsonii
        - Tasman peninsula dusky antechinus, Antechinus vandycki
      - Genus Murexia
        - Habbema dasyure, Murexia habbema
        - Short-furred dasyure, Murexia longicaudata
        - Black-tailed dasyure, Murexia melanurus
        - Long-nosed dasyure, Murexia naso
        - Broad-striped dasyure, Murexia rothschildi
      - Genus Phascogale
        - Red-tailed phascogale, Phascogale calura
        - Northern brush-tailed phascogale, Phascogale pirata
        - Brush-tailed phascogale, Phascogale tapoatafa
  - Subfamily Sminthopsinae
    - Tribe Planigalini
      - Genus Planigale
        - Paucident planigale, Planigale gilesi
        - Long-tailed planigale, Planigale ingrami
        - Orange-headed Pilbara planigale, P. kendricki
        - Common planigale, Planigale maculata
        - New Guinean planigale, Planigale novaeguineae
        - Cracking-clay Pilbara planigale, P. tealei
        - Narrow-nosed planigale, Planigale tenuirostris
    - Tribe Sminthopsini
      - Genus Antechinomys
        - Kultarr, Antechinomys laniger
      - Genus Ningaui
        - Wongai ningaui, Ningaui ridei
        - Pilbara ningaui, Ningaui timealeyi
        - Southern ningaui, Ningaui yvonnae
      - Genus Sminthopsis
        - †S. floravillensis
        - S. crassicaudata species-group
          - Fat-tailed dunnart, Sminthopsis crassicaudata
        - S. macroura species-group
          - Kakadu dunnart, Sminthopsis bindi
          - Carpentarian dunnart, Sminthopsis butleri
          - Julia Creek dunnart, Sminthopsis douglasi
          - Stripe-faced dunnart, Sminthopsis macroura
          - Red-cheeked dunnart, Sminthopsis virginiae
        - S. granulipes species-group
          - White-tailed dunnart, Sminthopsis granulipes
        - S. griseoventer species-group
          - Grey-bellied dunnart, Sminthopsis griseoventer
        - S. longicaudata species-group
          - Long-tailed dunnart, Sminthopsis longicaudata
        - S. murina species-group
          - Kangaroo Island dunnart, Sminthopsis aitkeni
          - Chestnut dunnart, Sminthopsis archeri
          - Little long-tailed dunnart, Sminthopsis dolichura
          - Sooty dunnart, Sminthopsis fulginosus
          - Gilbert's dunnart, Sminthopsis gilberti
          - White-footed dunnart, Sminthopsis leucopus
          - Slender-tailed dunnart, Sminthopsis murina
        - S. psammophila species-group
          - Hairy-footed dunnart, Sminthopsis hirtipes
          - Ooldea dunnart, Sminthopsis ooldea
          - Sandhill dunnart, Sminthopsis psammophila
          - Lesser hairy-footed dunnart, Sminthopsis youngsoni
