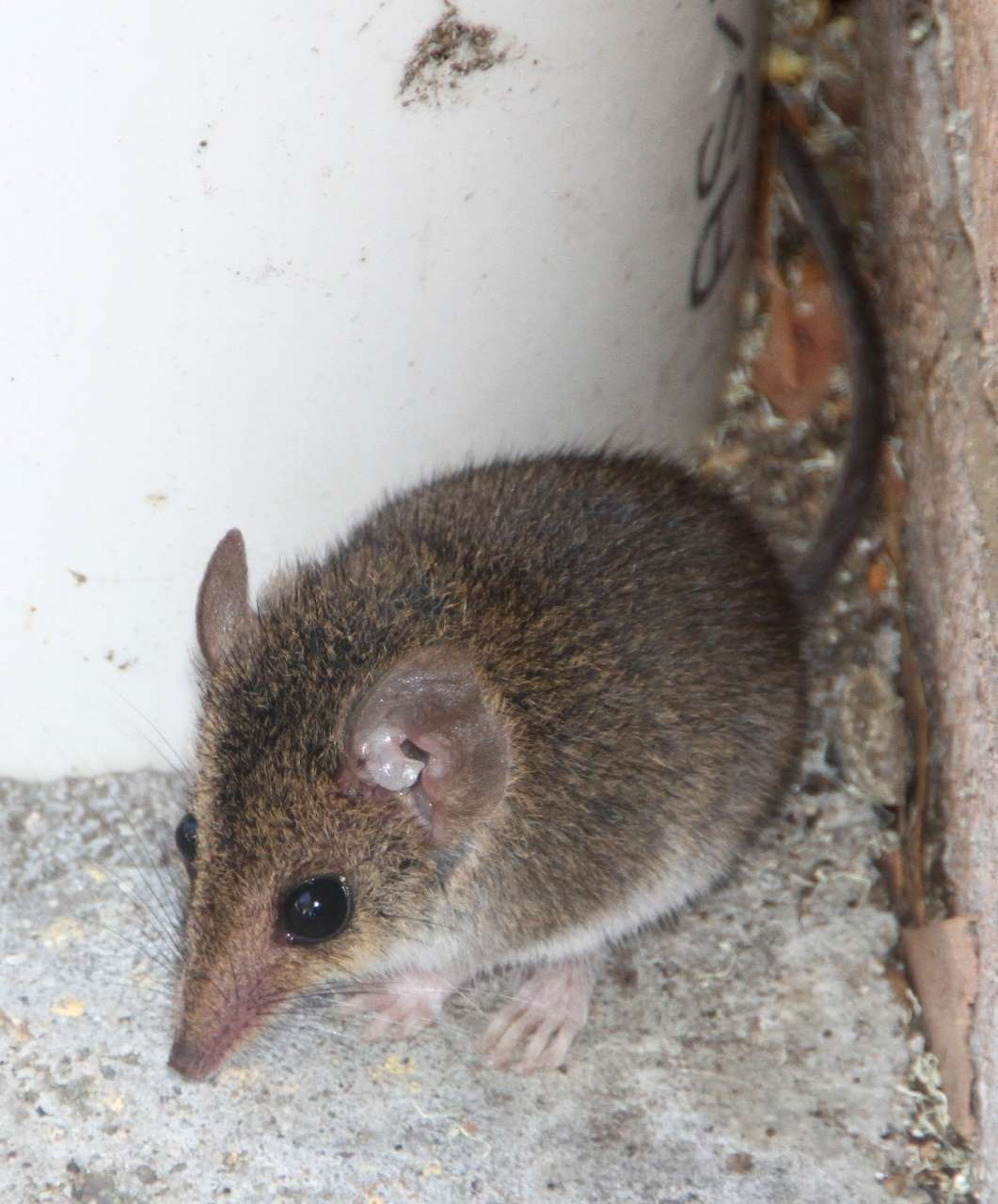

Conservation status
- Least Concern (IUCN 3.1)

Scientific classification
- Kingdom: Animalia
- Phylum: Chordata
- Class: Mammalia
- Infraclass: Marsupialia
- Order: Dasyuromorphia
- Family: Dasyuridae
- Genus: Sminthopsis
- Species: S. leucopus

Binomial name
- Sminthopsis leucopus (J. E. Gray, 1842)
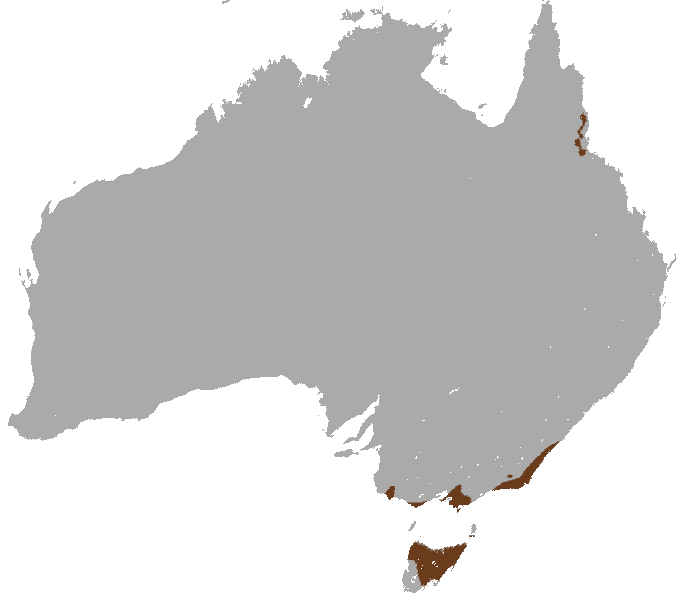
- White-footed dunnart range

= White-footed dunnart =

Species of marsupial

The white-footed dunnart (Sminthopsis leucopus) is a marsupial that occurs on Tasmania and mainland Australia. It occurs along the coast and in inner Gippsland and Alpine areas up to 400 metres near Narbethong. In southern New South Wales, the white-footed dunnart is known to occur at elevations at least as high as 1000 metres. The length from snout to tail tip is 14–20 cm (5.5–7.9 in) of which head and body are 7–11 cm (2.8–4.3 in) and the tail 7–9 cm (2.8–3.5 in) long. They weigh 19–27 g (0.67–0.95 oz).

== Habitat ==
The average rainfall of its habitat is between 60–100 cm (24–39 in) per year. Unlike the fat-tailed dunnart, this species requires forest and woodland cover of more than 50% of any square metre of heath understory or mid-story plant species. Other habitats include coastal tussock grasslands, sedgeland and wet heath. This dunnart has an individual range of about 120 square metres for both sexes, although this varies greatly among males, with some males acquiring territories of up to 1200 square metres. Male territories often overlap those of females.

== Breeding and social organisation ==
The white-footed dunnarts mate in summer. The female white-footed dunnart will give birth in September or October, and up to ten joeys may be delivered. After eight weeks old, the young will exit their mothers pouch, continue nursing for a month, then disperse.

== Diet ==
The feeding habit of this 20–30 g species is similar to that of other dasyurids; it is an opportunistic feeder. Diet consists of invertebrates and reptiles of between 1 and 18 mm in length.

== Subspecies ==
An unnamed subspecies of white-footed dunnart was recently found in northern Queensland. However, it has been named endangered due to its population scarcity.
