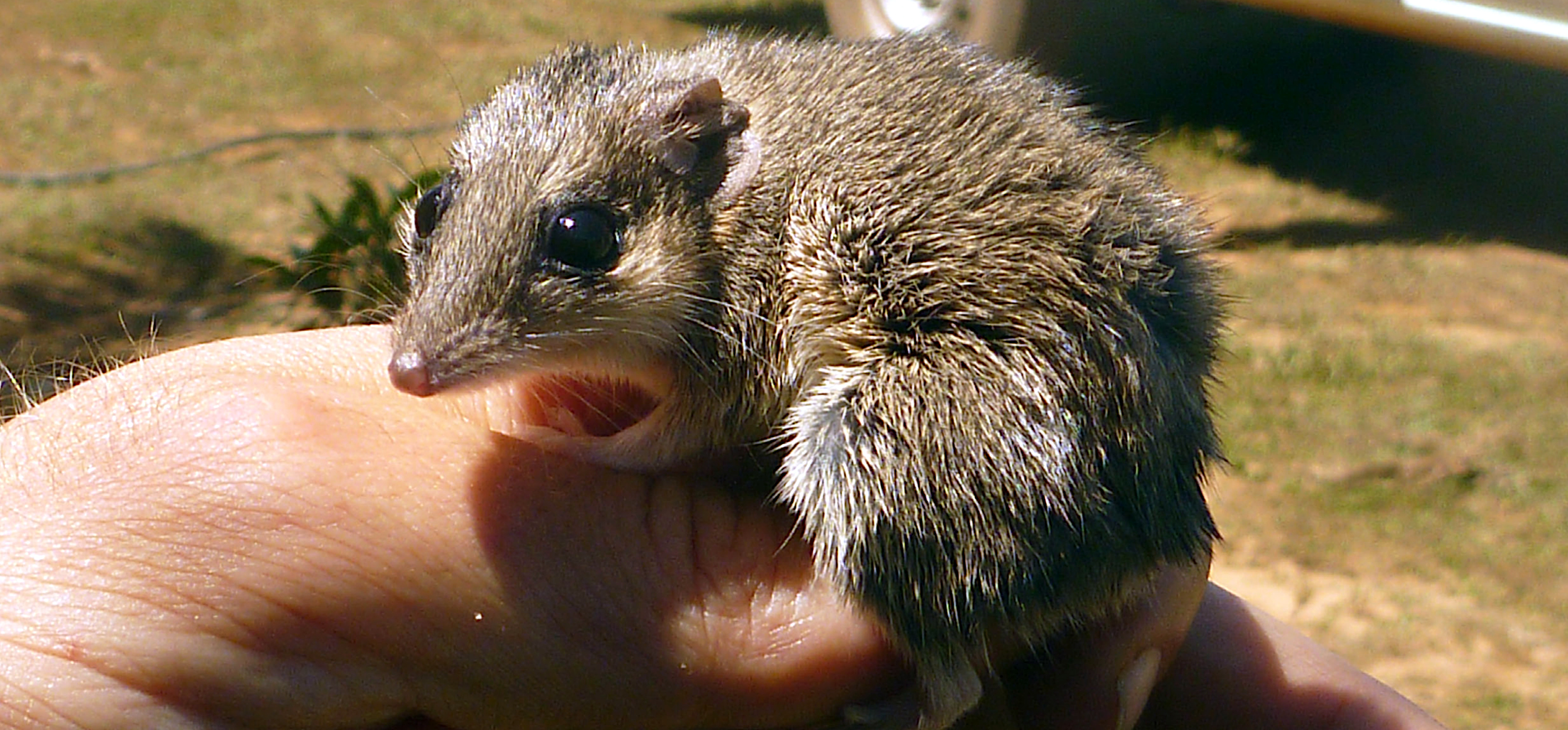

Conservation status
- Vulnerable (IUCN 3.1)

Scientific classification
- Kingdom: Animalia
- Phylum: Chordata
- Class: Mammalia
- Infraclass: Marsupialia
- Order: Dasyuromorphia
- Family: Dasyuridae
- Genus: Sminthopsis
- Species: S. butleri

Binomial name
- Sminthopsis butleri Archer, 1979
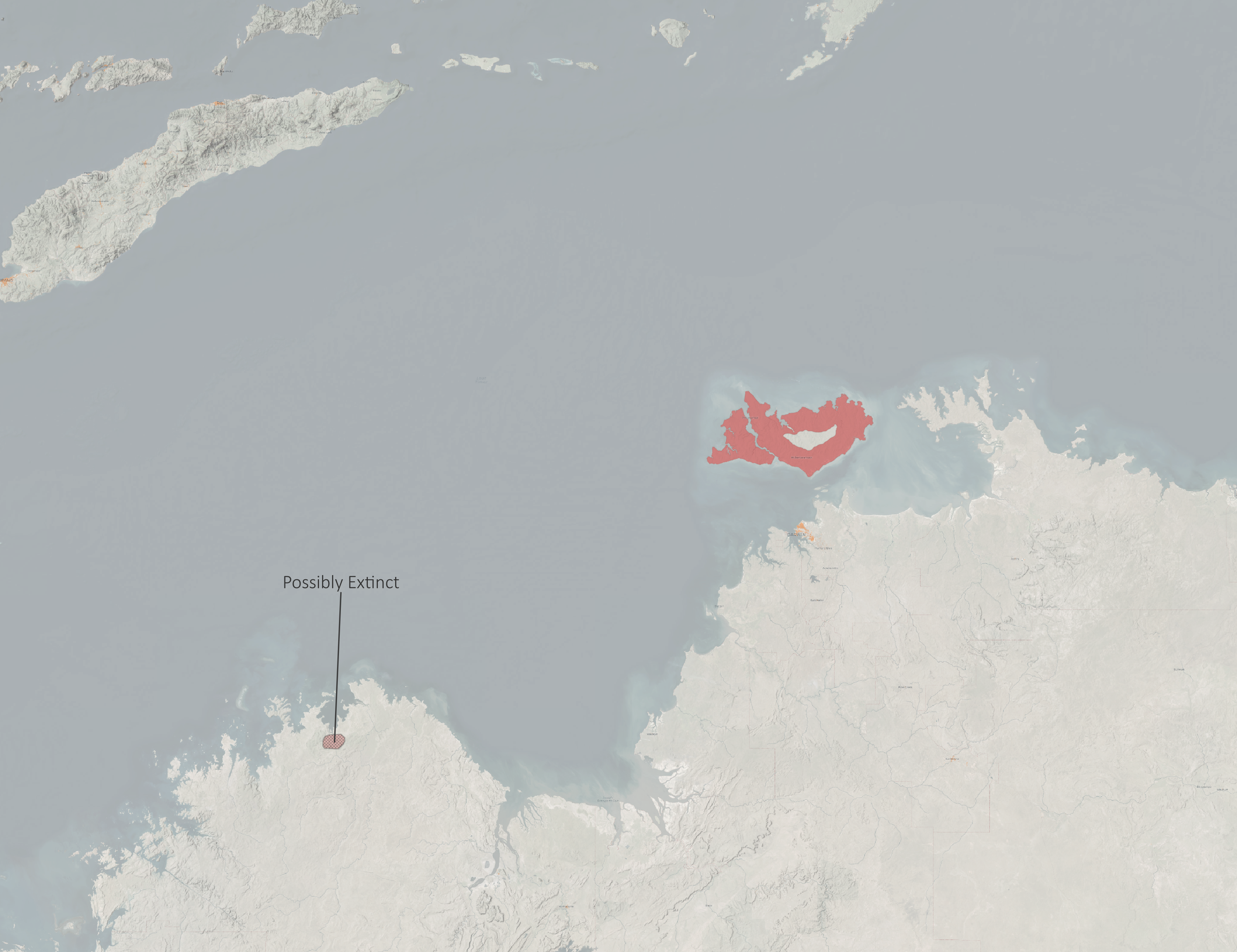
- Carpentarian dunnart range

= Carpentarian dunnart =

Species of marsupial

The Carpentarian dunnart (Sminthopsis butleri) also known as Butler's dunnart is a marsupial with a puffy brown or mouse grey colour above and the underside of white, similar to its close relative the Kakadu dunnart. Head to anus length is 75-88mm with a tail of 72-90mm long for a total length of 147-178mm. Weight varies from 10-20g depending on a variety of factors including sex, food abundance, habitat etc.

== Distribution and habitat ==
Found in the Northern Kimberley's near Kalumburu in Western Australia and Bathurst and Melville Island in the Northern Territory. Habitat consists of eucalyptus and melaleuca forest with sandy soils up to and including 20 km (12 mi) from the coast.

== Social organisation and breeding ==
May breed in the dry season but needs more study.

== Diet ==
No information, but most likely insects and small vertebrates.
