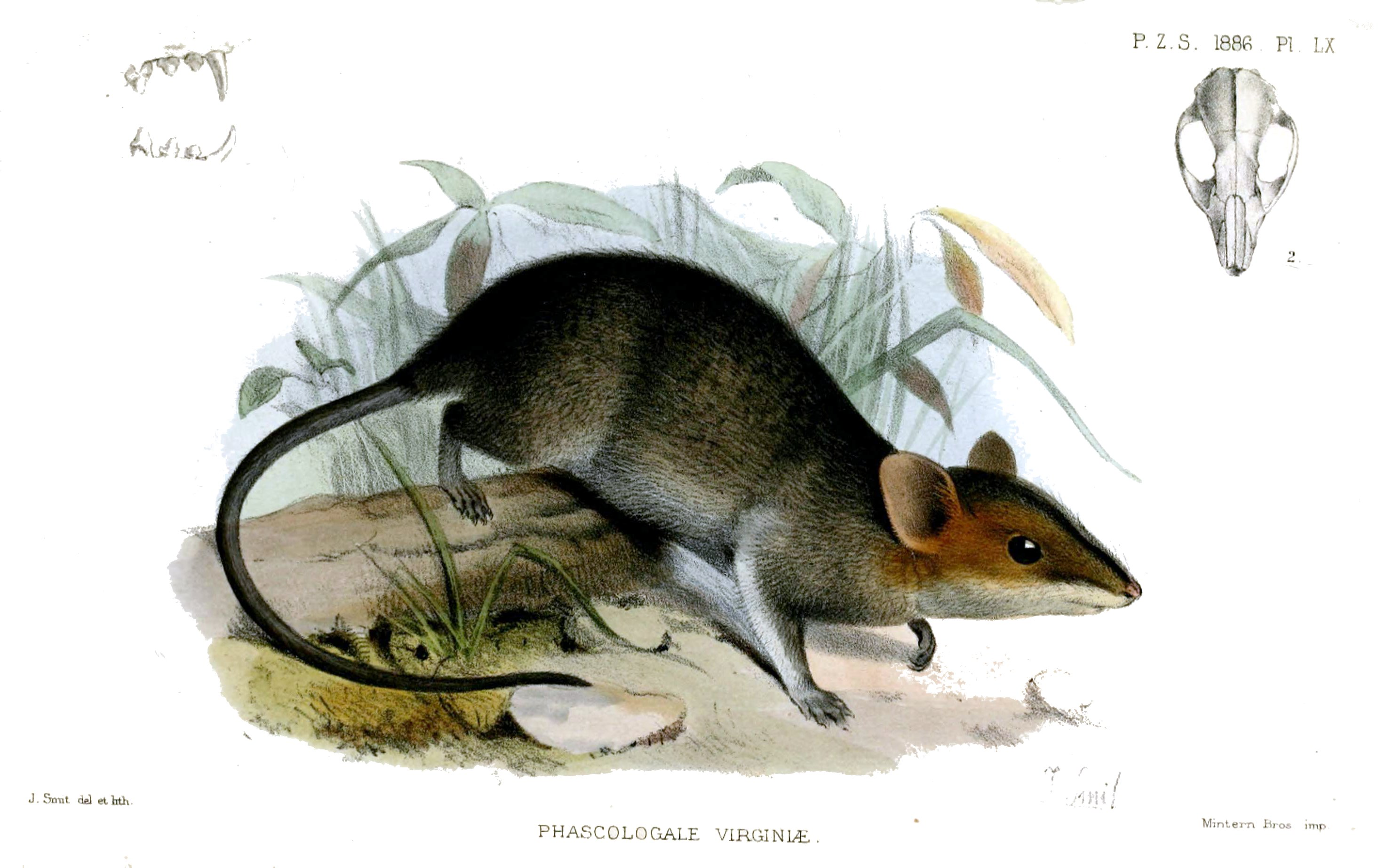

Conservation status
- Least Concern (IUCN 3.1)

Scientific classification
- Kingdom: Animalia
- Phylum: Chordata
- Class: Mammalia
- Infraclass: Marsupialia
- Order: Dasyuromorphia
- Family: Dasyuridae
- Genus: Sminthopsis
- Species: S. virginiae

Binomial name
- Sminthopsis virginiae (de Tarragon, 1847)
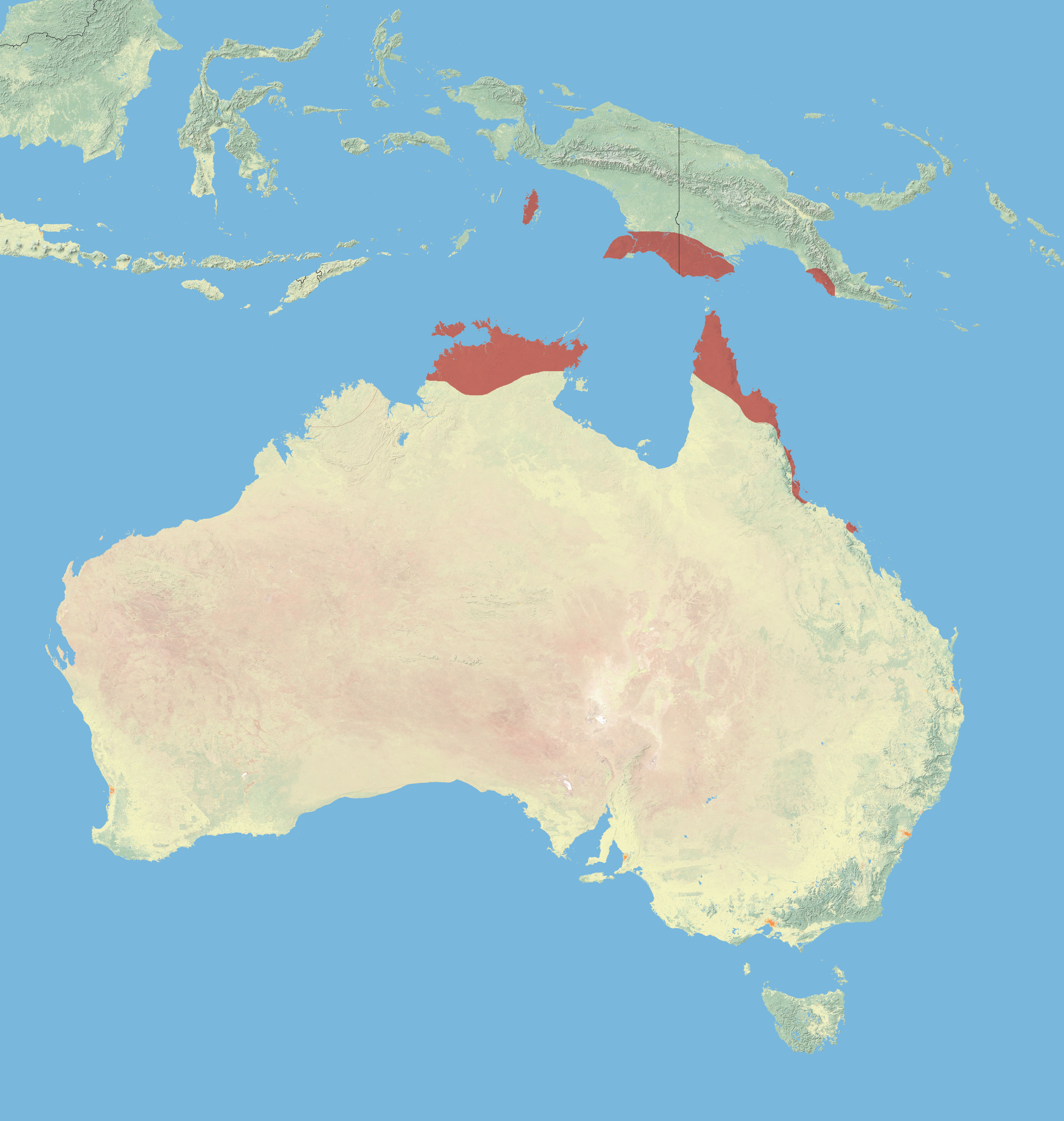
- Red-cheeked dunnart range

Synonyms
- Phascologale virginiae

= Red-cheeked dunnart =

Species of marsupial

The red-cheeked dunnart (Sminthopsis virginiae) is an Australasian marsupial so called because of the distinctive red hair on its cheek. Its total length is 167–270 mm (6.6–10.6 in); its average body length is 80–135 mm (3.1–5.3 in) with a tail of 87–135 mm (3.4–5.3 in). Ear length is 12–13 mm (0.47–0.51 in). Its weight varies between 18 and 75 g (0.63 and 2.65 oz). Its tail is thin and pale pink.

== Distribution and habitat ==
The red-cheeked dunnart is distributed in Australia and New Guinea. The nominate subspecies S. v. virginiae occurs in the Queensland around the North Gulf, NE coasts, Mackay to Cape York. Subspecies S. v. nitela inhabits the Kimberley's to the top of Northern Territory. Habitat includes woodlands, open rocky forests, savannah grasslands, swamps, soaks and margins of tropical forests.

== Social organisation and breeding ==
The behaviour of the red-cheeked dunnart, like most Sminthopsis species, is not well known. They breed from October to March. Young are gestated for 15 days and weaned at 65–70 days with maturity by 4–6 months.

== Diet ==
Its typical diet includes insects and small vertebrates. They quickly learn to avoid the poisonous cane toad.

== Subspecies ==
There are three recognised subspecies of the red-cheeked dunnart:

- S. v. virginiae, found in Australia
- S. v. nitela, found in Australia
- S. v. rufigenis, found in New Guinea
