= Ooldea dunnart =

Conservation status
- Least Concern (IUCN 3.1)

Scientific classification
- Kingdom: Animalia
- Phylum: Chordata
- Class: Mammalia
- Infraclass: Marsupialia
- Order: Dasyuromorphia
- Family: Dasyuridae
- Genus: Sminthopsis
- Species: S. ooldea

Binomial name
- Sminthopsis ooldea Troughton, 1965
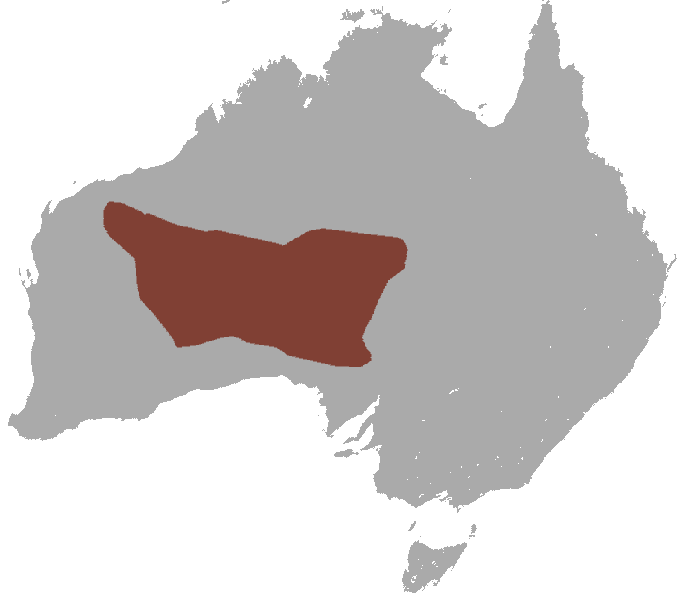
- Ooldea dunnart range

Species of marsupial

The Ooldea dunnart (Sminthopsis ooldea), also called Troughton's dunnart after the person who found the species, is an Australian marsupial similar to the hairy-footed dunnart. It is greyish-yellow on its upper body and white on the underside with dark patches on its crown, forehead and in front of the eyes, and a pink thinly furred carrot-shaped tail. Its total length is 11.5–17.3 cm (4.5–6.8 in); its average body length is 5.5–8 cm (2.2–3.1 in) with a tail of 6–9.3 cm (2.4–3.7 in). Its ear length is 14–17 mm (0.55–0.67 in). It weighs between 10 and 18 g (0.35 and 0.63 oz).

== Distribution and habitat ==
The Ooldea dunnart is found from the Tanami Desert in the Northern Territory, south to Ooldea in South Australia and east to neighbouring areas of Western Australia. The type of habitat it inhabits includes arid eucalypt and acacia woodlands, heathlands mallee scrub and hummock grasslands, low shrubland, open scrub and tall open shrubland.

== Social organisation and breeding ==
The Ooldea dunnart has eight young between September and November but, since the species is not much studied, not much more is known. It is nocturnal and has been found in burrows and hollow logs.

== Diet ==
It is believed, from evidence gathered, that this species eats insects.
