= Kakadu dunnart =

Conservation status
- Near Threatened (IUCN 3.1)

Scientific classification
- Kingdom: Animalia
- Phylum: Chordata
- Class: Mammalia
- Infraclass: Marsupialia
- Order: Dasyuromorphia
- Family: Dasyuridae
- Genus: Sminthopsis
- Species: S. bindi

Binomial name
- Sminthopsis bindi Van Dyck, Woinarski & Press, 1994
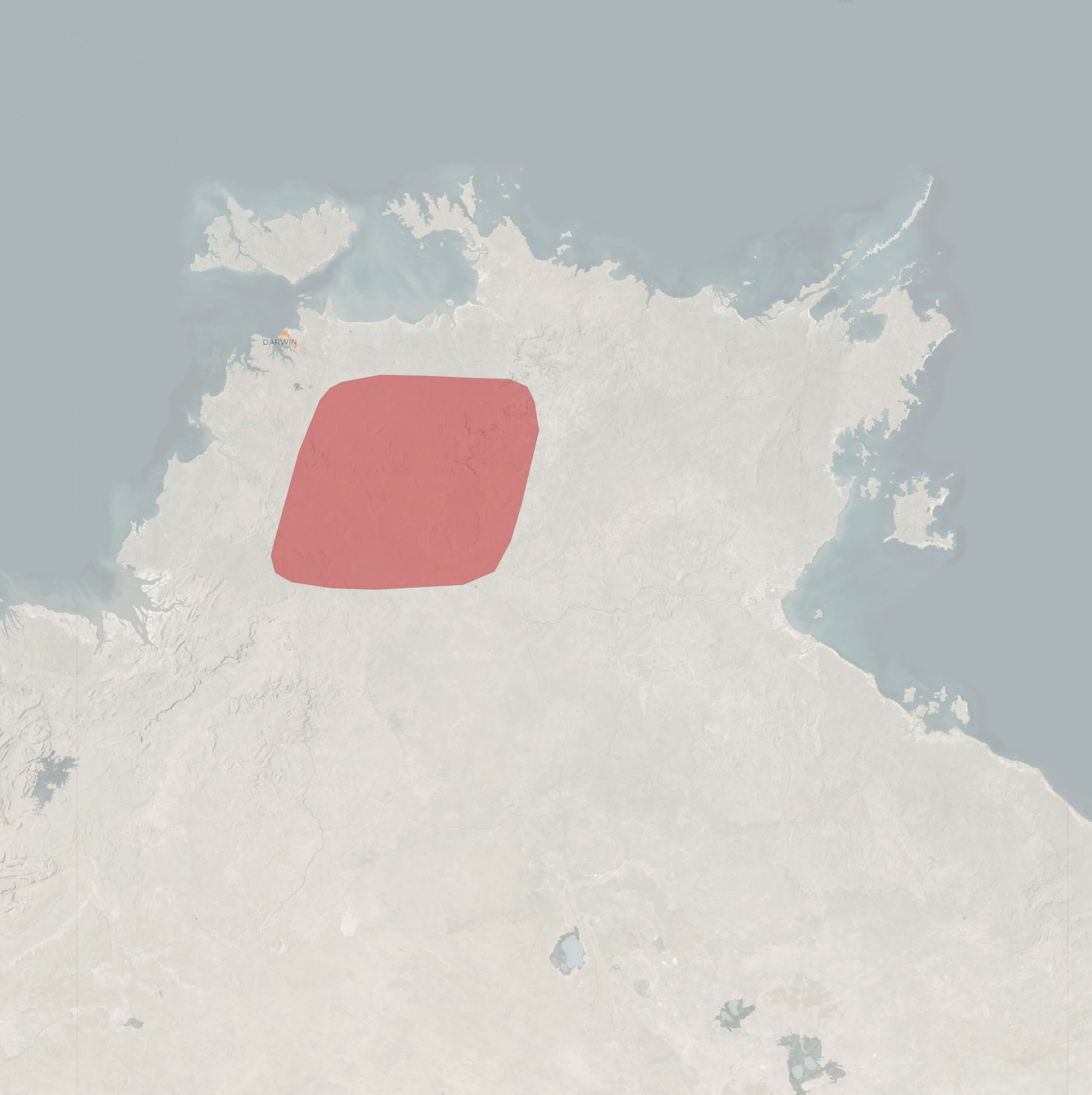
- Distribution of the Kakadu dunnart

Species of marsupial

The Kakadu dunnart (Sminthopsis bindi) is a dunnart first described in 1994 and whose closest relative is the Carpentarian dunnart. It typically has a body length of 50-85mm with a tail 60-105mm long, for a total length between 110-190mm. It weighs between 10-25g, placing it in the mid-range of dunnarts. Its colour is grey, gingery on the upper body and underbelly, with white feet.

The Kakadu dunnart lives near the Top End of the Northern Territory of Australia around the Kakadu National Park. It prefers a habitat of stony woodlands on a hilly geography.

Little is known about the social organisation or breeding habits of this species, as it is not well studied, but it probably breeds in the dry season and may burrow.

Its diet may include arthropods and other insects.
