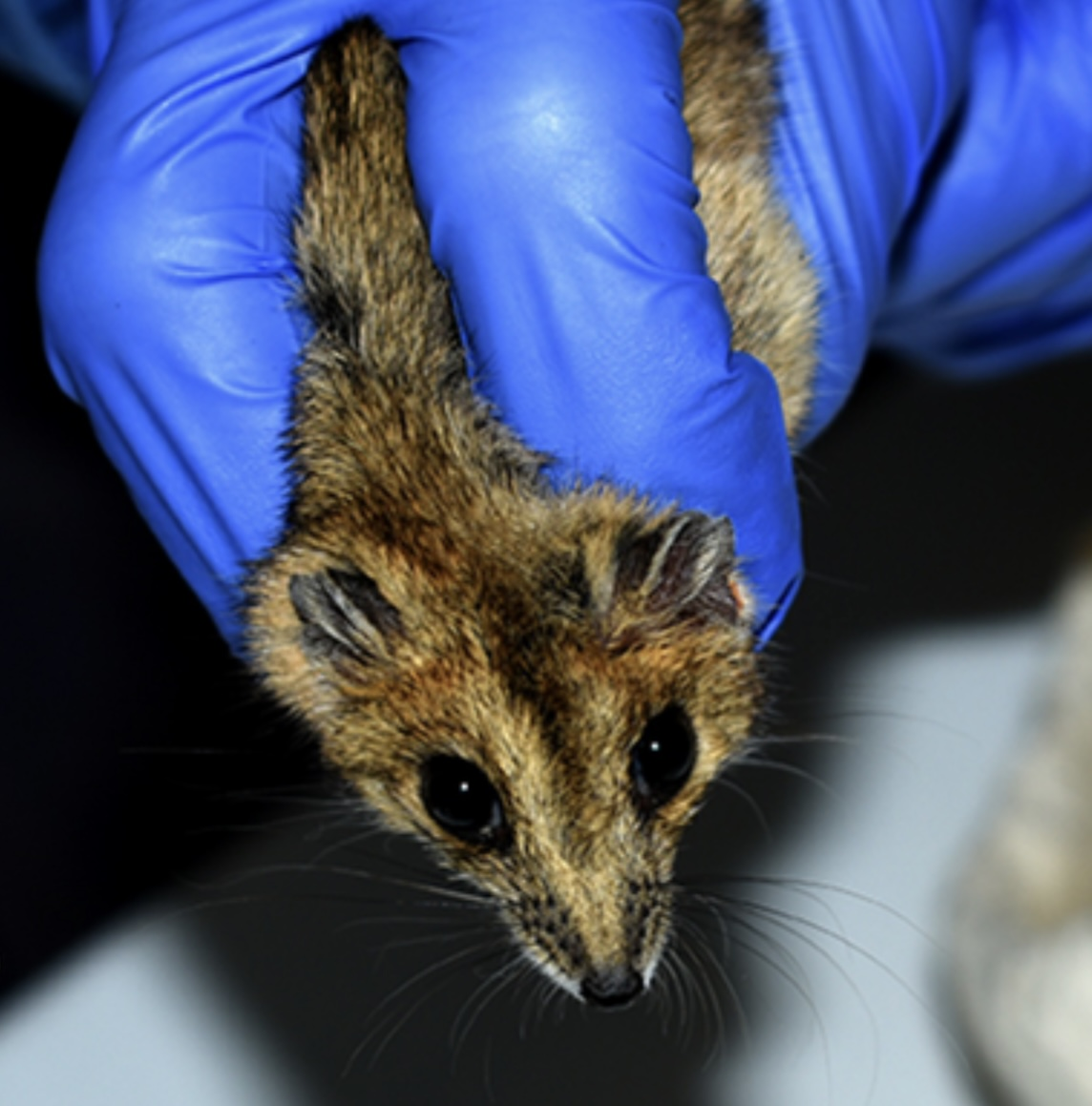

Conservation status
- Near Threatened (IUCN 3.1)

Scientific classification
- Kingdom: Animalia
- Phylum: Chordata
- Class: Mammalia
- Infraclass: Marsupialia
- Order: Dasyuromorphia
- Family: Dasyuridae
- Genus: Sminthopsis
- Species: S. douglasi

Binomial name
- Sminthopsis douglasi Archer, 1979
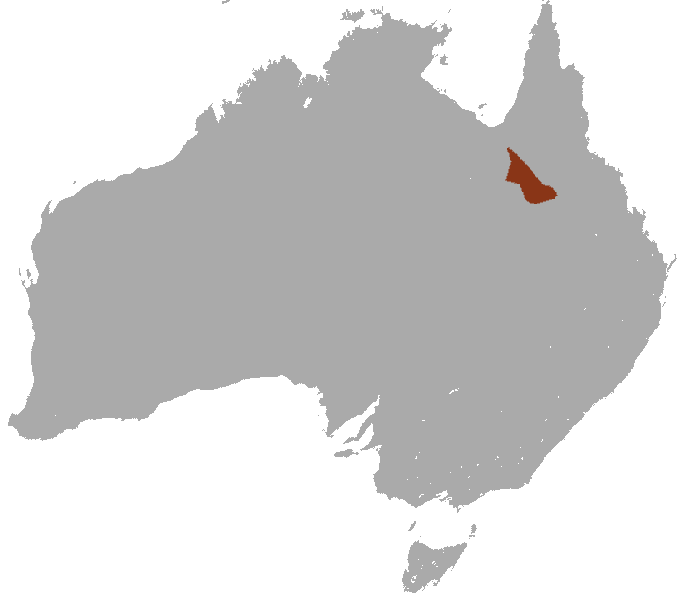
- Julia Creek dunnart range

= Julia Creek dunnart =

Species of marsupial

The Julia Creek dunnart (Sminthopsis douglasi) is a marsupial with a buffy brown upperside and white underside. This dunnart has a body length of 100–135 mm with a tail of 60–105 mm to make a total length of 160–240 mm. Its weight is between 40 and 70 g. The length of the hind foot is 22–24 mm. The species has a dark brown triangle colour from above and below the eye with the point at the nose, and another dark stripe on top of the skull. A healthy dunnart has a carrot-shaped tail filled with fat stores.

== Distribution and habitat ==
Julia Creek dunnarts are typically found on 8000 km^{2} in the Mitchel Grass downs of riparian grasslands, between Julia Creek and Richmond in Queensland, it possibly occurs in the Mitchell Plateau of Western Australia. The prickly acacia is a threat to its habitat as it kills native grasslands. Cultivation and introduced species also threaten this dasyurid's habitat.

== Social organization and breeding ==
During the dry season, it shelters in cracks in the ground; in the wet season it shelters under vegetation. This nocturnal animal doesn't drink often as all the water it needs is in the food. Gestation is for 13 to 16 days with an average of eight young born. The joeys are dependent on the mother for around 70 days. The age at which captive animals commence breeding ranges from 13 to 38 weeks (females) and 23 to 40 weeks (males). Breeding in wild populations is seasonal and occurs over a six-month period from August to March, which encompasses the hottest and wettest time of the year. Both females and males are known to be capable of breeding in more than one season and females have the potential to rear two litters in a season. A 4 mm-long joey can breathe through its skin.

== Diet ==
The diet of this species is made up of insects and small vertebrates.

== Status ==
The Julia Creek dunnart is currently listed as a near threatened species by the IUCN. This is likely due to the invasion of prickly acacia plants and introduced predators such as cats and foxes. It was thought to be extinct in the 1930s until it was rediscovered in 1992.
