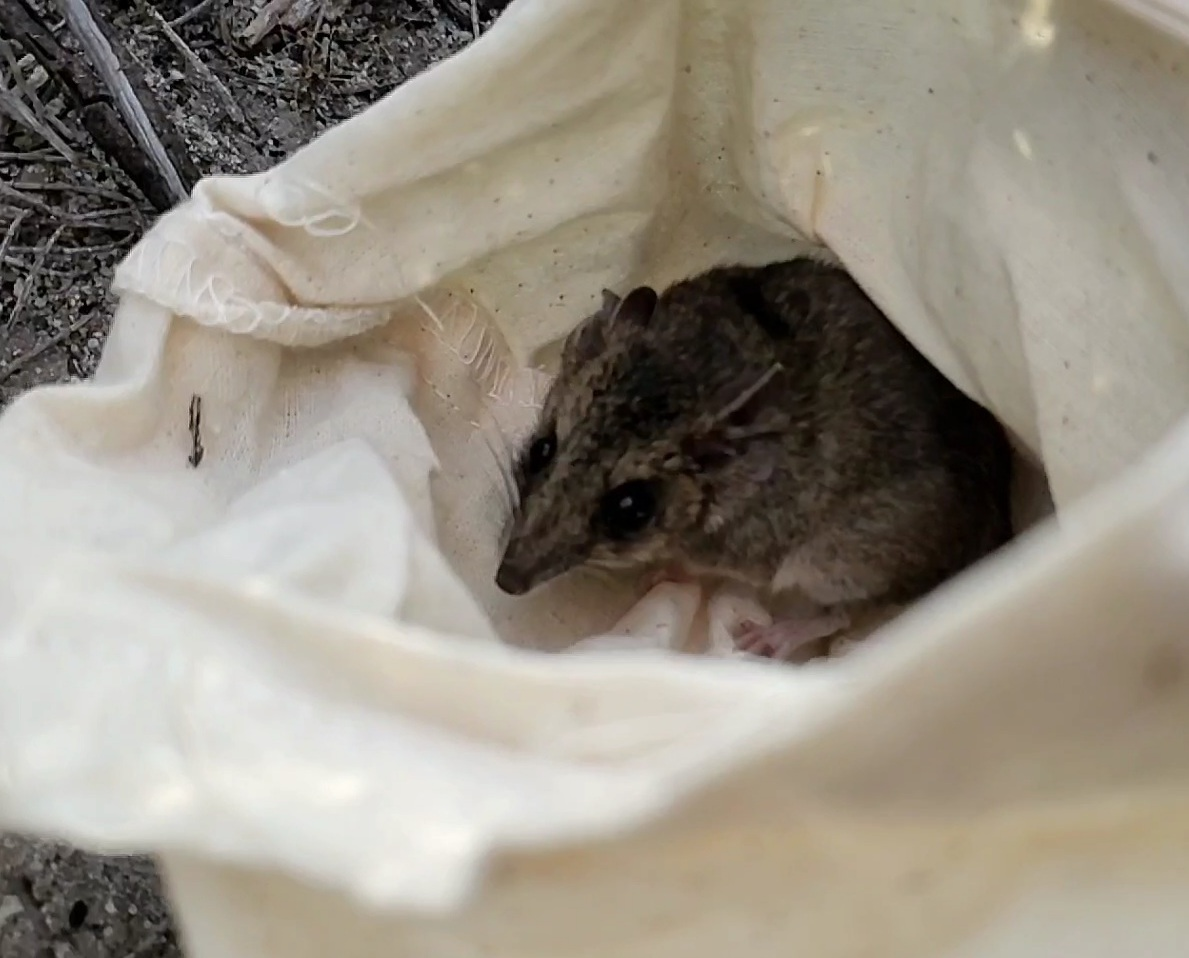
- Little long-tailed dunnart pit-trapped at Alexander Morrison National Park in Western Australia (August 2022)

Conservation status
- Least Concern (IUCN 3.1)

Scientific classification
- Kingdom: Animalia
- Phylum: Chordata
- Class: Mammalia
- Infraclass: Marsupialia
- Order: Dasyuromorphia
- Family: Dasyuridae
- Genus: Sminthopsis
- Species: S. dolichura

Binomial name
- Sminthopsis dolichura Kitchener, Stoddart & Henry, 1984
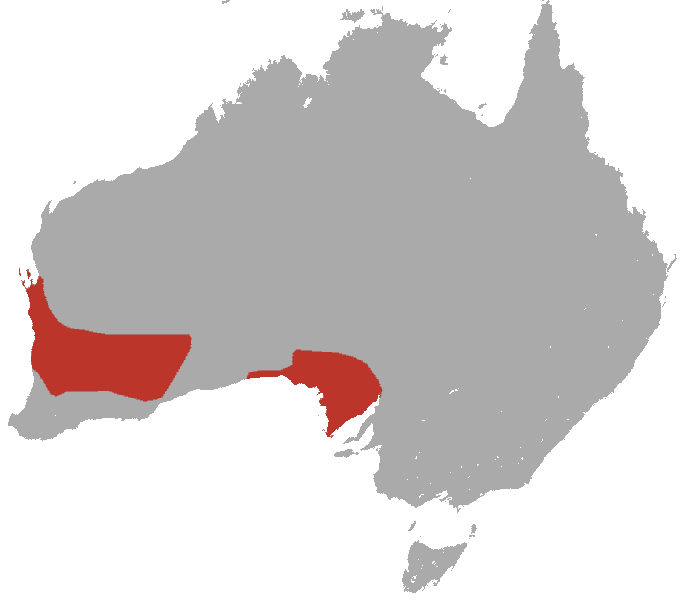
- Little long-tailed dunnart range

= Little long-tailed dunnart =

Species of marsupial

The Little long-tailed dunnart (Sminthopsis dolichura) is a dunnart that was, along with Gilbert's dunnart, described in 1984. The length from snout to tail is 15–20 cm (5.9–7.9 in) of which head and body are 6.5–5 cm (2.6–2.0 in) and tail 8.5–10.5 cm (3.3–4.1 in) long. Hind foot size is 16–17 mm (0.63–0.67 in), the ear length is 17–19 mm (0.67–0.75 in) and the weight is 10–20 g (0.35–0.71 oz).

== Distribution and habitat ==
There are two separate areas of habitation for this species, but no subspecies have been identified. The Western Australia distribution is in the northern Goldfields and Geraldton hinterland, northwest coast, southwest coast and western plateau. The South Australian area includes the coastal areas of the Great Australian Bight on the Nullarbor Plain, Eyre Peninsula west of Port Augusta. Habitat the species prefers include dry sclerophyll, forest, semi-arid woodlands, mallee, (tall, tall open and low open) shrublands and open heath vegetation.

== Social organisation and breeding ==
The species is nocturnal with males having a large home range, an adaptation to exploiting various habitats from one season to another. Females breed as early as 5–8 months and then only between March and August. Males can breed at 4–5 months. The joeys are weaned during September–December or when 5 grams. The lifespan of females is approximately two years and males just over one year.

== Diet ==
Primarily an insect eater, the little long-tailed dunnart will also consume small reptiles, amphibians and mammals.
