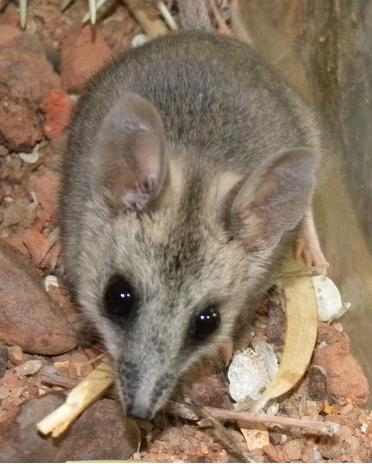

Conservation status
- Least Concern (IUCN 3.1)

Scientific classification
- Kingdom: Animalia
- Phylum: Chordata
- Class: Mammalia
- Infraclass: Marsupialia
- Order: Dasyuromorphia
- Family: Dasyuridae
- Genus: Sminthopsis
- Species: S. macroura

Binomial name
- Sminthopsis macroura (Gould, 1845)
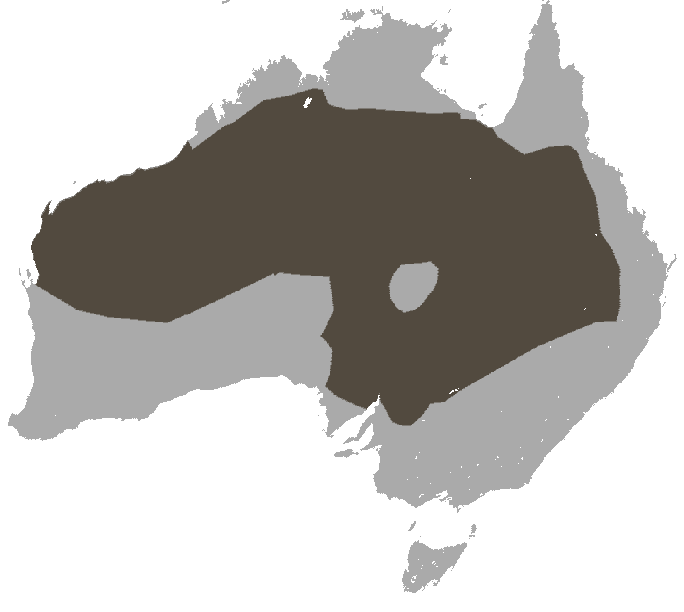
- Stripe-faced dunnart range

= Stripe-faced dunnart =

Species of marsupial

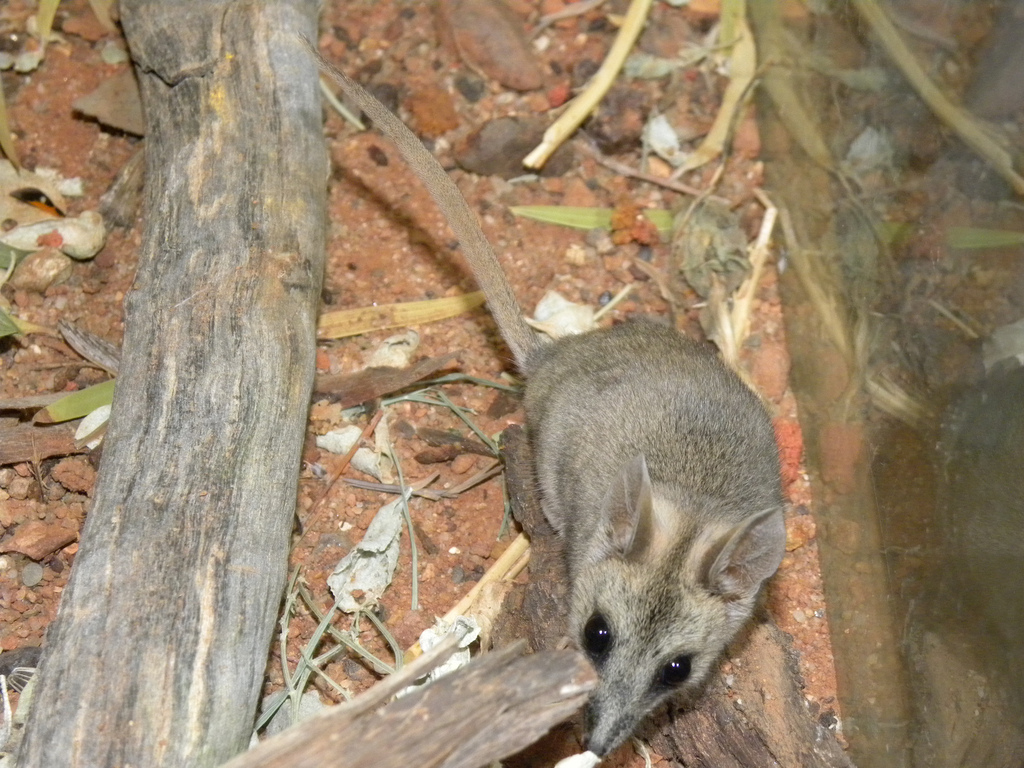
Sminthopsis macroura

The striped-faced dunnart (Sminthopsis macroura) is a small, Australian, nocturnal, "marsupial mouse," part of the family Dasyuridae. The species' distribution occurs throughout much of inland central and northern Australia, occupying a range of arid and semi-arid habitats.

While the species has a broad distribution range, it has been declining across much of Australia, including the western region of New South Wales (NSW). This is due to several threatening processes, primarily habitat degradation.

This has led to the NSW Office of Environment and Heritage listing the species as 'vulnerable'. The species is not listed on the Environment Protection and Biodiversity Conservation Act 1999 (EPBC Act). The International Union for Conservation of Nature (IUCN) Red List of Threatened Species list the species as of 'least concern'.

Recent genetic studies have discovered that this dunnart species is in fact three distinct species that over several million years diverged from each other. However, because they are difficult to distinguish, they tend to be treated as a single species.

The three subspecies are as follows:

- Sminthopsis macroura macroura in central, eastern, and western Australia
- S.m. stalkeri in central northern Australia
- S.m. froggatti in the Kimberley region

== Description ==
The stripe-faced dunnart has an average length of 155–198 mm from the tip of the snout to the tip of the tail, a snout to anus distance of 75–98 mm, a tail measuring 80–100 mm and an ear length of 17–18 mm. Its weight varies between 15 and 25 grams. The species is pale grey-brown above with an obvious dark strip on the forehead from the top of muzzle to between ears, and the ears are slightly darker than other dunnart species. Underparts and feet are white. The tail is often swollen, wide at the base and narrowing to the tail, with hairs extending beyond the tail tip.

The species can be distinguished from other similar species like the fat-tailed dunnart (S. crassicaudara) by the dark stripe on the forehead, which is only partly similar to the Julia Creek dunnart (S. douglasi). However, the Julia Creek dunnart is two to three times heavier than the striped-faced dunnart and is longer with a head and body length of 100 to 135mm.

The maximum longevity of the species in captivity is 4.9 years.

== Distribution and habitat ==
The stripe-faced dunnart's distribution covers a broad area of central and northern Australia, from the Pilbara to central Northern Territory, western and central Queensland, south to north-east South Australia to north and west New South Wales. The species also inhabits a range of habitats, mainly within arid regions, occurring in low shrublands containing saltbush (Atriplex spp.) and bluebush (Maireana spp.), in spinifex grasslands on sandy soils, among sparse Acacia shrublands, in tussock grasslands on clay, sandy or stony soils, on open salt lakes, and on low, shrubby, rocky ridges. The highest abundance of the species occurs mainly in tussock grasslands and shrublands where overgrazing by domestic and feral stock is sparse or absent, and often where there are drainage lines in natural vegetation which tend to improve the availability of food and shelter. The species shelters under rocks and logs, in cracks in the soil and in tussock grass.

A study has found that the species is capable of successfully surviving and reproducing in small remnants of native vegetation which are fenced to prevent large herbivores from grazing. However, adults of the dunnart were not detected in the grazing area surrounding the non-grazed habitat. Several factors can be attributed to this finding, that the greater diversity and cover of vegetation may increase arthropod biomass providing a more guaranteed supply of food for the dunnarts. The denser vegetation cover in the non-grazed sites provides more protection from predators and the absence of livestock reduces soil compaction, allowing for an entire network of soil cracks that provide favourable refuges and foraging sites for the species.

== Social organisation and breeding ==
The stripe-faced dunnart breeds from July through February and has a gestation period of eleven days, the shortest of any mammal. The species is polyoestrous with a mean cycle length of 23–25 days. Males are capable of breeding throughout the breeding season and for up to three seasons.

The litter size can vary to a maximum of eight joeys which is equal to the number of teats. They have a pouch life of 40 days, with the pouch fully enclosing the newborn young who are attached to a nipple until they are well developed. If the mother has only one or two young she might not rear them. After leaving the pouch, the young remain in the nest and suckle for another 30 days. There are usually two litters per season, but in captivity the dunnart can possibly raise three.

Females mature at about four months of age, earlier than males who mature at about nine months. Environmental factors such as ambient temperature and abundance of available food are significant influences regulating reproduction. Studies have found that male stripe-faced dunnarts have lower sperm production compared to other dasyurid species.

== Diet ==
The species mostly eats invertebrates, excluding ants, and may also occasionally consume other small mammals and lizards. An analysis of faecal matter of the stripe-faced dunnart at two locations found that their diet consisted entirely of invertebrates from the classes of Arachnida, Chilopoda, Crustacea, and Insecta. The species is known to eat more isopterans (termites) than the fat-tailed dunnart. The species consumed up to 50% of their body mass equivalent in food per day compared to fat-tailed dunnarts which require up to 81%, yet both species tend to have similar body weight.

== Survival ==
The stripe-faced dunnart has developed many strategies and adaptations to survive in the extreme, arid environment of greatly varying temperatures and lack of water and nutrients. To survive the fluctuating temperatures, the species can maintain an even body temperature with a marked diurnal temperature cycle, torpor and avoiding direct exposure. To avoid exposure during the summer, the species is active at night and rests during the day in burrows it digs, or nests made of grasses, leaves and other materials in hollow logs, under dense vegetation or tree cavities. It also shelters in soil cracks, under rocks, logs and in animal burrows.

To survive throughout winter, the species enters torpor daily, usually during the night and awakening by midday, when it uses sun basking to rewarm itself. As the winter nights become colder, the daily torpor bouts become longer and deeper; females tend to remain in torpor longer than males. Torpor allows the species to decrease water loss and reduce energy expenditure by up to 90%, considerably reducing the amount of food to be foraged; this is especially useful for when food availability during the winter is low. The stripe-faced dunnart may also readily enter daily torpor during the summer if food availability is low or ambient temperatures are unstable.

Like the fat-tail dunnart, the stripe-faced dunnart is able to store excess fat in its tail during periods of abundant food, and uses these food stores when food is scarce, often during the winter. The dunnart is capable of gaining all its moisture needs from the insects that it eats.

== Captive colonies ==
The species has long been held in various research organisations throughout Australia. It has been used as a model marsupial species for studying marsupial genetics, breeding and immunology.

== Threats ==
The main threats to the species are overgrazing and trampling of shrublands and tussock grasslands by feral herbivores and domestic stock. Habitat clearing, fragmentation, landscape degradation, and fires which occur too frequently and extensively, are also threats to its habitat. Predation by feral cats and red foxes (Vulpes vulpes) directly impacts the species' population. Removal of fallen timber threatens the species, as it relies on this for shelter from the heat and predator, and forages for invertebrates that live in or under woody debris. The dunnarts are very sensitive to the organophosphorus pesticide fenitrothion which at sub-lethal intoxication can cause lethargy and temporary immobilisation, increasing the risk of predation. This pesticide is used by local landholders to control locusts.

== Conservation ==
The NSW Office of Environment and Heritage implemented a program called 'Saving our Species' which aims to conserve as many threatened species as possible, including the stripe-faced dunnart. Some of the measures being taken include:

- Trialling the installation of small (10-20ha) stock-proof enclosures within agricultural landscapes, to function as habitat refuges. These sites will be monitored to determine the effectiveness of this management strategy.
- Working with relevant landholders and fire management authorities to create an appropriate fire regime that preserves patches of ground cover vegetation and dead wood.
- Encouraging local landholders to protect patches of intact saltbush and other ground layer vegetation, as well as reducing grazing pressure and other disturbances.
- Conducting surveys in areas of suitable habitat to discover new populations and determine the species' distribution and abundance.
- Raising awareness of the impacts of using fenitrothion and promoting the use of less toxic alternatives to local landholders.
