= White-tailed dunnart =

Conservation status
- Least Concern (IUCN 3.1)

Scientific classification
- Kingdom: Animalia
- Phylum: Chordata
- Class: Mammalia
- Infraclass: Marsupialia
- Order: Dasyuromorphia
- Family: Dasyuridae
- Genus: Sminthopsis
- Species: S. granulipes

Binomial name
- Sminthopsis granulipes Troughton, 1932
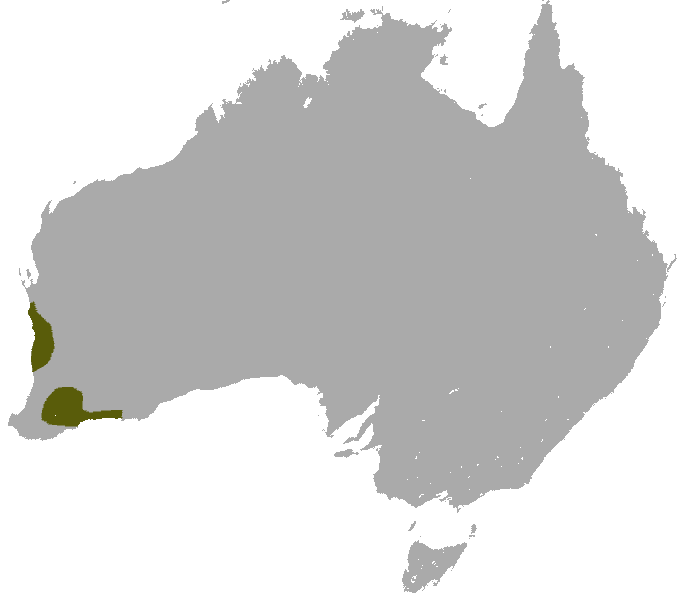
- White-tailed dunnart range

Species of marsupial

The white-tailed dunnart (Sminthopsis granulipes), also known as the ash-grey dunnart, is a dunnart native to Australia.

== Taxonomy ==
A species first named by Gerard Krefft in 1872, using a specimen obtained at Albany by the local collector George Maxwell. The author assigned the name Podabrus albocaudatus with a description that was published in an Eastern States newspaper, the Sydney Mail. The same specimen, the holotype of the species, was described by Ellis Troughton in 1932 without reference to Krefft's earlier description. Despite the precedence of Krefft's first description, later recognised as a valid and available name, the later name was in widespread use and conserved to ensure taxonomic stability; the name Podabrus albocaudatus was deemed to be an objective synonym and declared a nomen oblitum and Sminthopsis granulipes Troughton 1932 a nomen protectum.

== Description ==
A species of Sminthopsis with a head and body length from 70 to 100 mm (2.8 to 3.9 in), a tail measurement of 56–68 mm (2.2–2.7 in) and a weight which varies from 18 to 35 grams (0.63 to 1.23 oz). The upperparts of the pelage are uniform in colour, a lighter shade of fawn that merges with the white ventral side. The feet and tail are pinkish white. They are distinguished by the relative tail length, which is less than body, and its greater width at the base; a fine brown stripe occurs at the top of the tail. The soles of the feet at the hind-legs of S. granulipes are mostly covered in a uniform granular texture.

== Distribution and habitat ==
This dasyurid occupies two separate areas in Western Australia. The first is east of Perth in the western Goldfields area and the second is to the north of Perth between Kalbarri and Jurien Bay. Habitat consists of coastal heath and sparse to dense shrublands sometimes with mallee eucalypt.

== Social organisation and breeding ==
Little is known of the behaviour and breeding of this marsupial, though it is most likely nocturnal. It breeds from June through August with young weaned by October.

== Diet ==
The white-tailed dunnart mainly eats terrestrial insects.

== Sources ==
- Groves, C. P. (2005). Wilson, D. E.; Reeder, D. M. (eds.). Mammal Species of the World: A Taxonomic and Geographic Reference (3rd ed.). Baltimore: Johns Hopkins University Press. p. 34. ISBN 0-801-88221-4. OCLC 62265494.
