= Chestnut dunnart =

Conservation status
- Data Deficient (IUCN 3.1)

Scientific classification
- Kingdom: Animalia
- Phylum: Chordata
- Class: Mammalia
- Infraclass: Marsupialia
- Order: Dasyuromorphia
- Family: Dasyuridae
- Genus: Sminthopsis
- Species: S. archeri

Binomial name
- Sminthopsis archeri Van Dyck, 1986
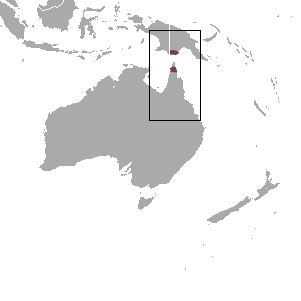
- Chestnut dunnart range

Species of marsupial

The chestnut dunnart (Sminthopsis archeri) is a dunnart that was described by Van Dyck in 1986 and is named because of its chestnut colour in the upperparts of its body. The length from snout to tail is 167–210 mm, of which head to anus is 85–105 mm and tail is 82–105 mm long. The hind foot size is 17–20 mm, ear length is 17–21 mm and weight is 15–20 g.

== Distribution and habitat ==
There are a handful of records known from southern Papua New Guinea and in Australia on the east and west coasts of Cape York Peninsula, with one record at Blackbraes National Park west of Townsville. Its habitats in Australia consist of tall stringybark woodlands and tall forests situated in red earth. In Papua New Guinea it is also found in savannah.

== Social organisation and breeding ==
The species is little studied and not much information is known on the behaviour, but it does breed during July–October when it is the dry season.

== Diet ==
It most likely feeds on insects and or small mammals, reptiles and amphibians.

== Sources ==
- Groves, C. P. (2005). Wilson, D. E.; Reeder, D. M. (eds.). Mammal Species of the World: A Taxonomic and Geographic Reference (3rd ed.). Baltimore: Johns Hopkins University Press. p. 33. ISBN 0-801-88221-4. OCLC 62265494.
- Menkhorst, P.; Knight, F. (2001). A field Guide to the Mammals of Australia. Oxford Press. ISBN 0-19-550870-X.
