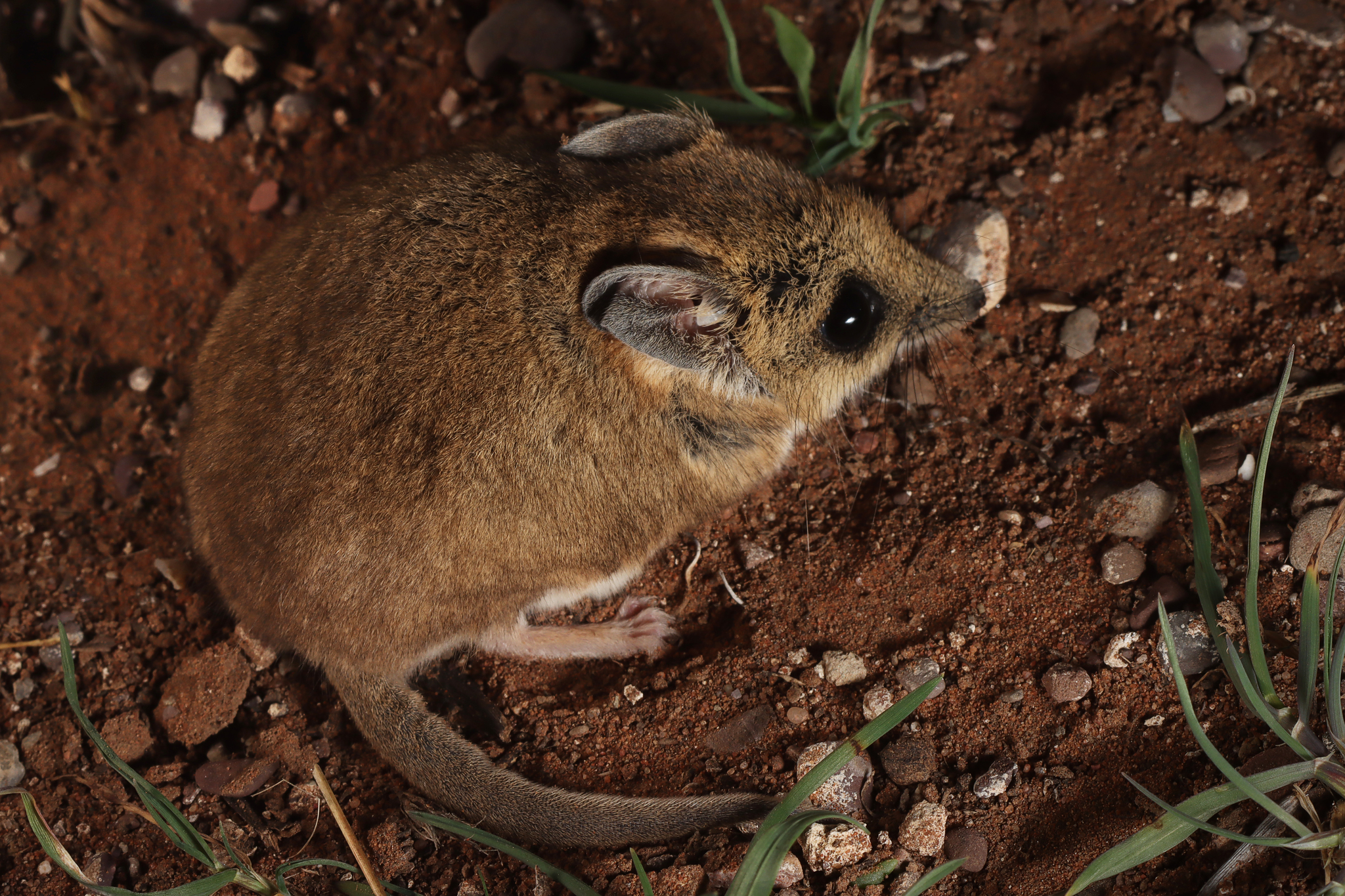

Conservation status
- Least Concern (IUCN 3.1)

Scientific classification
- Kingdom: Animalia
- Phylum: Chordata
- Class: Mammalia
- Infraclass: Marsupialia
- Order: Dasyuromorphia
- Family: Dasyuridae
- Genus: Sminthopsis
- Species: S. crassicaudata

Binomial name
- Sminthopsis crassicaudata (Gould, 1844)
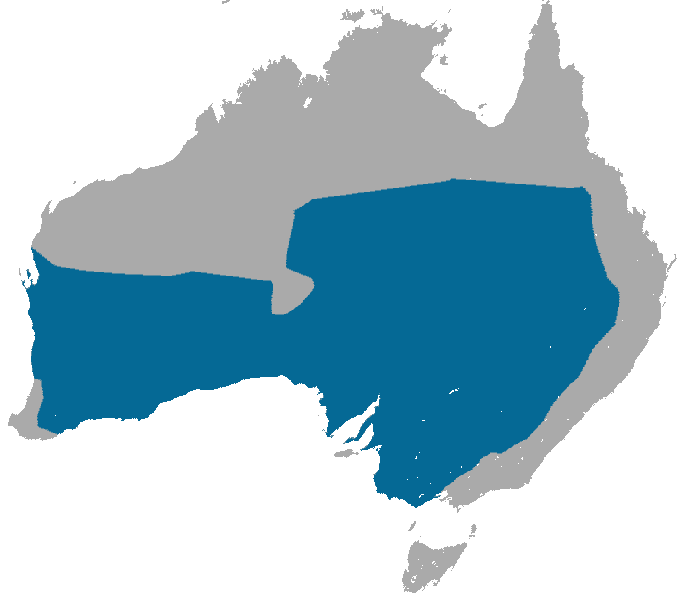
- Fat-tailed dunnart range

= Fat-tailed dunnart =

Species of mammal

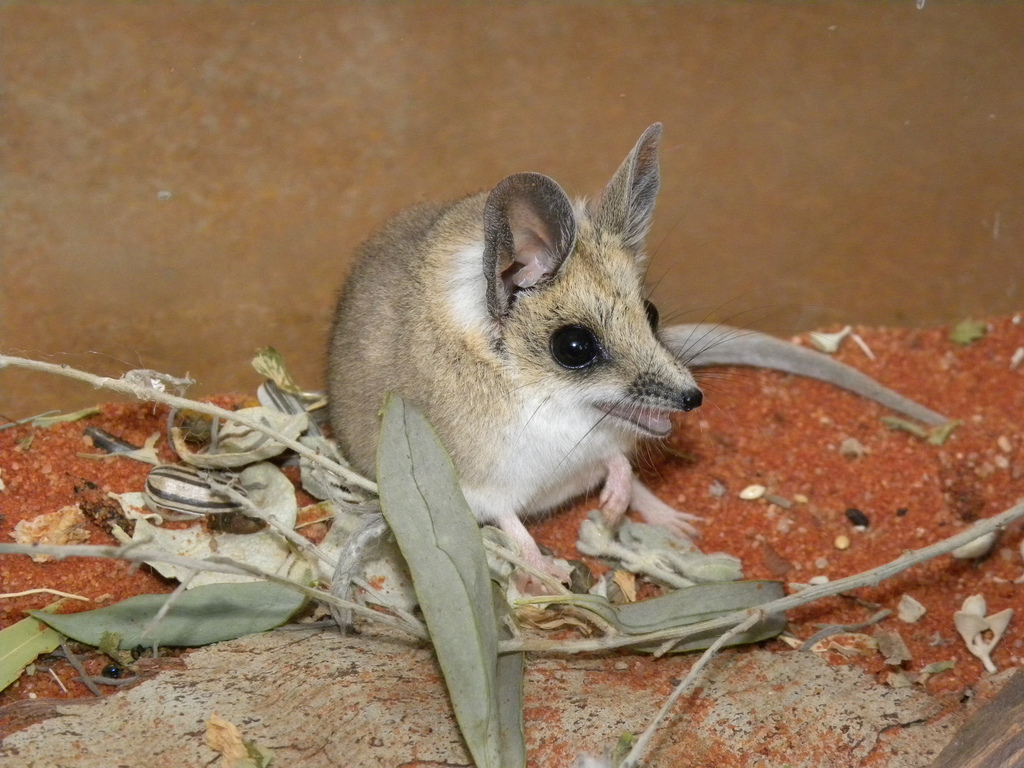
Sminthopsis crassicaudata

The fat-tailed dunnart (Sminthopsis crassicaudata) is a species of mouse-like marsupial of the Dasyuridae, the family that includes the little red kaluta, quolls, and the Tasmanian devil.

== Description ==
It has an average body length of 60–90 millimeters (2.4–3.5 in) with a tail of 45–70 millimeters (1.8–2.8 in). Its ear length is 14–16 millimeters (0.55–0.63 in). One of the smallest carnivorous marsupials, it varies in weight between 10–20 grams (0.35–0.71 oz). The tail becomes fat a few millimeters from the proximal end and remains so right up to the tip. The dunnart has trichromat vision, similar to that of some other marsupials as well as primates, but unlike most mammals, which have dichromat vision.

== Distribution and habitat ==
The range of S. crassicaudata in Australia is in diverse habitats except for the Kimberley region of Western Australia and the northern Northern Territory like Arnhem Land and Kakadu National Park, but avoids the Wannon and Mallee scrub habitats in Victoria. In the northeast of Victoria, the species can also be found in grassy woodlands and samphire shrublands. The subspecies S. c. crassicaudata is found in the Epping Forest National Park in Queensland. S. c. ferruginea is found around Lake Eyre in South Australia. S. c. centralis is found in Killalpannina (as Killalpanima, Lake Eyre East), near Etadunna, South Australia. Fat tailed dunnarts can be found in most deserts in Australia, e.g. the Simpson Desert and Gibson Desert.

The habitats in which the species can be found include sparse grasslands, open shrublands and farmlands where there is considerable bare land. The impact of unimproved farming has been positive for this species as the type of habitat created is suitable to this dunnart's requirements, but intensive agriculture is seen as a negative factor for the species.

== Social organisation and breeding ==
This species breeds from July to February, with the young in the pouch from July to April (Morton 1978b). Gestation is for 13 days and the young remain in the pouch for 70 days with litter size on average 7.5 with a 33% infant mortality rate. They generally have two litters per year, with females not breeding for the first year. The average life span of the females is 18 months, and males 15 months.

== Diet ==
The fat-tailed dunnart's diet includes insects such as beetles, spiders, small reptiles, and amphibians. It stores fat reserves in its carrot-shaped tail for times of food shortage.

== Survival ==
The fat-tailed dunnart is often eaten by other carnivores, including invasive foxes and cats, as well as other feral animals that share its environment.

The dunnart can survive in extreme, semi-arid environments. This is due to various physiological and behavioral characteristics. First, this marsupial is nocturnal and functions within a 24-hour circadian rhythm. During the nighttime it is protected from high temperatures that cause energy loss. While awake, it spends the majority of its time feeding. Every night it consumes approximately its own body weight of food. During periods of food shortage it decreases its duration of activity while also increasing its intensity of feeding. It uses specialized, sharp teeth to grind its prey into fine pieces. This increases its ability to obtain nutrients from its prey. It has a high rate of digestion and can use fat stored in its tail as an energy source.

Another survival technique that it uses is daily torpor. It lowers its body temperature and metabolic rate, in order to reduce energy expenditure. Torpor is unaffected by alterations in photoperiod but is greatly affected by environmental conditions. Two conditions must occur in order for the fat-tailed dunnart to use daily torpor: low ambient temperatures and food shortage. There are seasonal variations in torpidity. They use it more often in the winter because food is scarce and it requires more energy to maintain a high constant body temperature. During torpor, the body temperature can drop as low as 14.6 °C. This species does not use torpor for extended periods of time, thus the heart rate is variable and does not reach a steady state, such as seen in long-term torpidators. This species is unique in that it can use torpor during development and reproduction. Even during lactation a female is capable of entering daily torpor without affecting the offspring.

Coupled with the daily torpor is a process called re-warming. The re-warming process demands a high amount of energy in order to raise the body temperature. After awaking from a torpid state, these marsupials actively seek out areas in which they can bask in the sun to aid in this process.

Nesting is also used as a behavioral survival technique. During times of cold temperatures, the fat-tailed dunnart shares nests with rodent species such as the house mouse, (Mus musculus), to conserve heat. This is unusual because the fat-tailed dunnart preys upon these mice during less extreme conditions. Group nesting is observed only during times of non-breeding.

== Genetic proxy for thylacine ==
In August 2022, it was announced that the University of Melbourne will partner with Texas-based biotechnology company Colossal Biosciences to attempt to re-create the thylacine using the fat-tailed dunnart, one of its closest living relatives, and return it to Tasmania.
