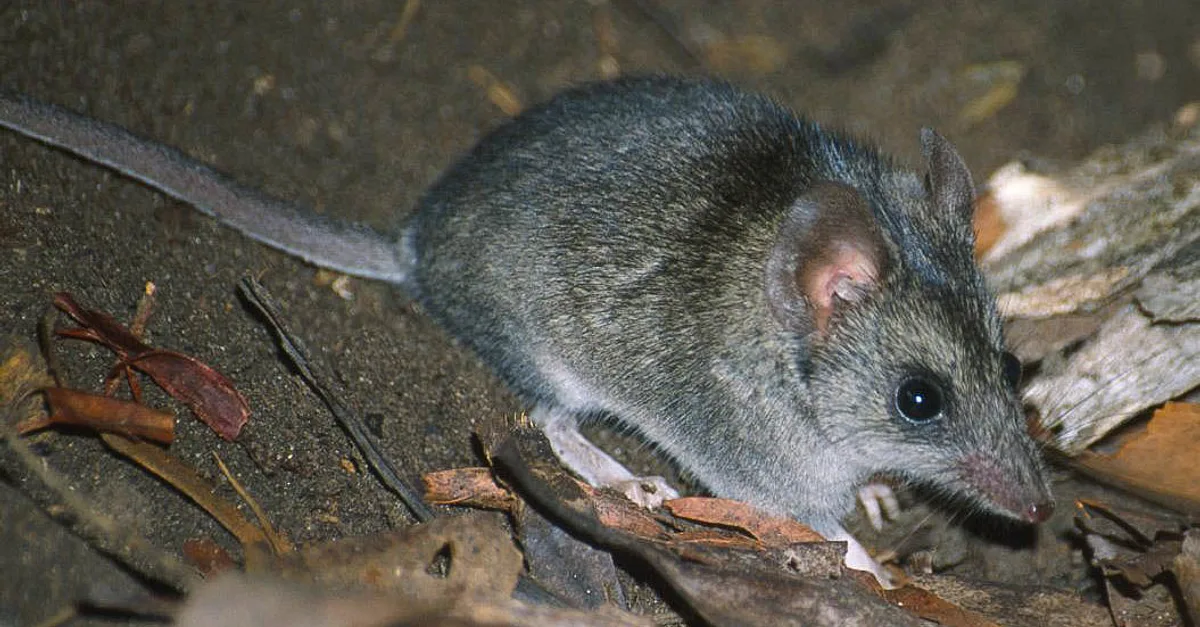

Conservation status
- Critically Endangered (IUCN 3.1)

Scientific classification
- Kingdom: Animalia
- Phylum: Chordata
- Class: Mammalia
- Infraclass: Marsupialia
- Order: Dasyuromorphia
- Family: Dasyuridae
- Genus: Sminthopsis
- Species: S. aitkeni

Binomial name
- Sminthopsis aitkeni Kitchener, Stoddart and Henry 1984
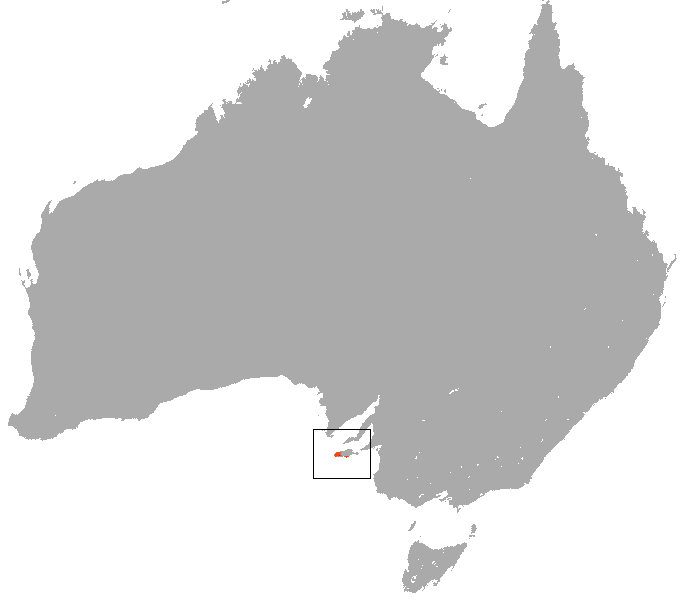
- Kangaroo Island Dunnart range

= Kangaroo Island dunnart =

Species of marsupial

The Kangaroo Island dunnart (Sminthopsis aitkeni) is a dark sooty-grey coloured dunnart species first described in 1969, with paler underparts of its body. It has an average body length of 170–198 mm (6.7–7.8 in), a snout to anus length of 80–93 mm (3.1–3.7 in), a tail measurement of 90–105 mm (3.5–4.1 in), a hind foot of 17.5 mm (0.69 in), ear length of 18 mm (0.71 in) and a weight of 20–25 grams (0.71–0.88 oz). The thin tail is also gray, but lighter on the bottom. The tail is longer than the body. Kangaroo Island dunnarts are dimorphic, with males larger than females.

The Kangaroo Island dunnart is listed as Critically Endangered by the International Union for Conservation of Nature (IUCN). The population was believed to be less than 500 before the 2019–2020 Australian bushfires. Following the fires, it is believed that only about 50 individuals exist.

== Distribution and habitat ==
This dasyurid is found only on the western half of Kangaroo Island in South Australia, the island's only endemic mammal. The species inhabits mallee heath on laterite soils. It is believed that the Kangaroo Island dunnart originally lived over the whole island. Today, there are six sites in which Kangaroo Island dunnarts have been found. All are either in the Flinders Chase National Park or the Ravine des Casoars Wilderness Protection Area, both on the western part of the island. Recent attempts to locate Kangaroo Island dunnarts on the eastern portion of the island have failed.

== Diet ==
The Kangaroo Island dunnart is nocturnal. Their diet consist of invertebrates. Studies of their feces showed that the major component of their diet is ants and spiders. Scorpions, beetles, and grasshoppers are also eaten.

== Social organization and breeding ==
Little is known of the Kangaroo Island dunnarts' behaviour. However, they are believed to be polyestrous, breeding twice a year. Based on trapping of juveniles, it is believed they breed in mid-September to October and again in November to December. Their gestation period is approximately 12 days. Little is known about parental care. It is thought that males only live for one mating season, whereas females may live to breed for two seasons.

== Conservation ==
The Kangaroo Island dunnart is listed as critically endangered on the IUCN Red List of Threatened Species. The Australian government first developed a recovery plan in 2011. As recently as the early 2000s, the wildlife research community was uncertain as to whether the species population in the wild was actually so low, or whether they were just particularly well concealed. Before the 2019–2020 bushfires, it was believed that there were fewer than 500 individuals.

The Kangaroo Island dunnart is believed to have had a range of the entire island at one time. Today, it has only been found on six sites on the western portion of Kangaroo Island. The population decrease has been attributed to several causes. Habitat loss is believed to be a primary cause. Although no clear habitat preference has been identified, Kangaroo Island dunnarts seem to be dependent on some low vegetation. The eastern portion of Kangaroo Island has been largely converted from the natural habitat for agricultural and grazing purposes. About 50% of Kangaroo Island's natural habitat has been cleared and Kangaroo Island dunnarts have not been found in the cleared regions. Also, tree dieback caused by Phytophthora cinnamomi, a water mould, has also affected Kangaroo Island dunnart populations. Feral cats may also be a factor in the decreased population.

Kangaroo Island dunnart populations are considered particularly vulnerable due to their small range, since a single event can negatively affect a large proportion of the population. Forest fire is a major concern and the major fires in 2019–2020 destroyed much of their remaining habitat. In May 2019, months prior to the start of the 2019–2020 bushfires, a workshop on the status of the dunnart was held on Kangaroo Island that included government representatives as well as scientists and landowners. The minutes from that meeting provided considerable information on the Kangaroo Island dunnart's status prior to the bushfires. The population was devastated by the bushfires, which likely wiped out a majority of the individuals; however, dunnarts have still been sighted in burnt and unburnt areas following the fires, raising hopes for recovery.
