= Hairy-footed dunnart =

Conservation status
- Least Concern (IUCN 3.1)

Scientific classification
- Kingdom: Animalia
- Phylum: Chordata
- Class: Mammalia
- Infraclass: Marsupialia
- Order: Dasyuromorphia
- Family: Dasyuridae
- Genus: Sminthopsis
- Species: S. hirtipes

Binomial name
- Sminthopsis hirtipes Thomas, 1898
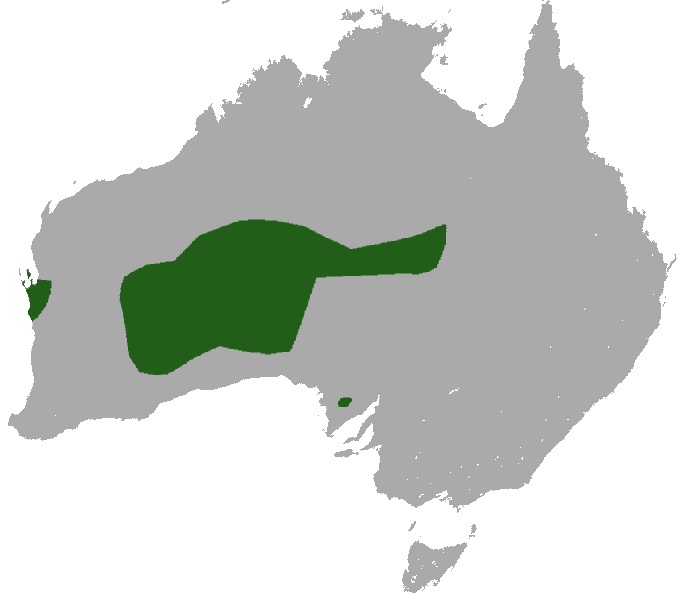
- Hairy-footed dunnart range

Species of marsupial

The hairy-footed dunnart (Sminthopsis hirtipes) is a dunnart that has silver hairs on the soles of it hind feet accompanied by long hair on the side of its sole. It is an Australian marsupial similar to the Ooldea dunnart, with its upper body yellow-brown and lower body white in colour. Its total length is 14.7–18 cm (5.8–7.1 in); its average body length is 7.2–8.5 cm (2.8–3.3 in) with a tail of 7.5–9.5 cm (3.0–3.7 in). Its ear length is 15 mm (0.59 in). It weighs between 13 and 19 g (0.46 and 0.67 oz). Its tail is thin and pinkish-white and can be thickened at the base.

== Distribution and habitat ==
This species inhabits three distinct areas; around Monkey Mia Bay and Kilbarri in Western Australia, a large area where the border of South Australia, Northern Territory and Western Australia converge and a small area between the Northern Territory and Queensland border 100 km north of the South Australian border. Its habitat includes arid and semi-arid woodlands, heath, savannah grasslands.

== Social organisation and breeding ==
The hairy-footed dunnart lives in burrows built by spiders, bull ants and other similar burrowing type species. Not much is known about the breeding cycle but the young are in the pouch by October and juveniles emerge by late April.

== Diet ==
Its typical diet includes mainly small reptiles and arthropods.
