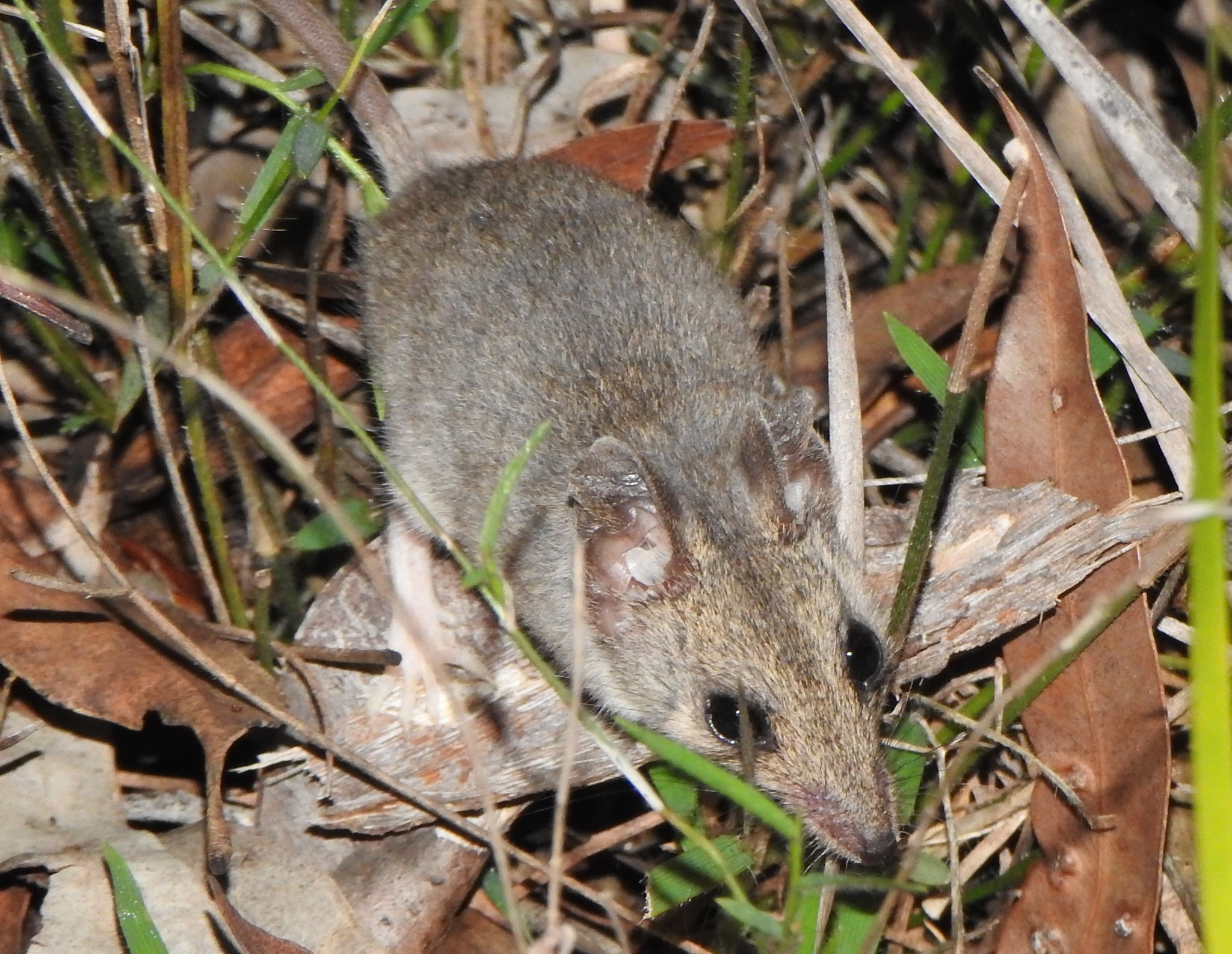

Conservation status
- Least Concern (IUCN 3.1)

Scientific classification
- Kingdom: Animalia
- Phylum: Chordata
- Class: Mammalia
- Infraclass: Marsupialia
- Order: Dasyuromorphia
- Family: Dasyuridae
- Genus: Sminthopsis
- Species: S. murina

Binomial name
- Sminthopsis murina (Waterhouse, 1838)
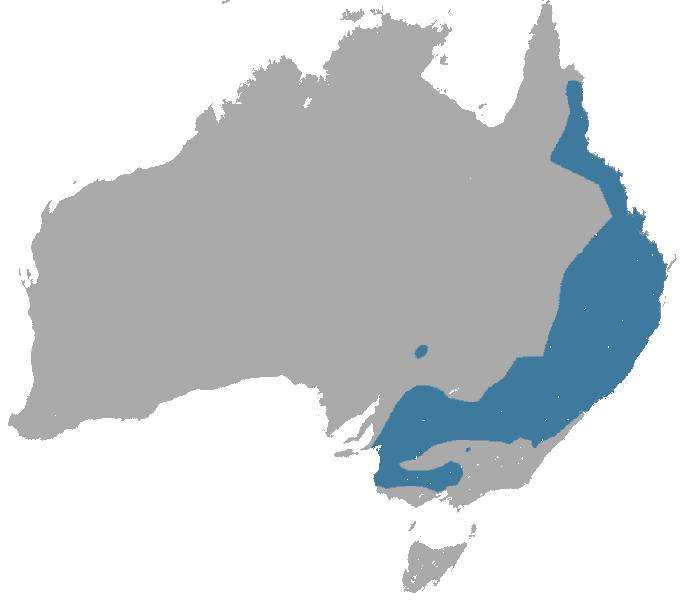
- Slender-tailed dunnart range

= Slender-tailed dunnart =

Species of marsupial

The slender-tailed dunnart (Sminthopsis murina), also known as the common dunnart in Australia, is a dasyurid marsupial. It has an average body length of 7 to 12 centimeters (2.8–4.7 in) with a tail length of 5.5 to 13 centimetres (2.2–5.1 in). It weighs 25–40.8 grams for males and 16.5–25.4 grams for females.

== Distribution and habitat ==
The slender-tailed dunnart is native to the east and south-east coast and interior of Australia, from the Cape York Peninsula to the Port Lincoln area of South Australia. There are two subspecies: S. m. murina is found throughout the distribution, and S. mu. tatei found between Townsville and Cairns in Queensland. This species is found at altitudes of between 60–360 metres (196.9–1181.1 ft) and preferes habitats with an average rainfall between 30–85 centimetres (11.8–33.5 in) per year. Habitats encountered include Mallee scrub, dry forests and woodlands and dry heath, these areas have sparse ground and shrub cover but have dense leaf and bark litter in Victoria to rainforest edges and swamps in Queensland.

== Breeding and socialization ==
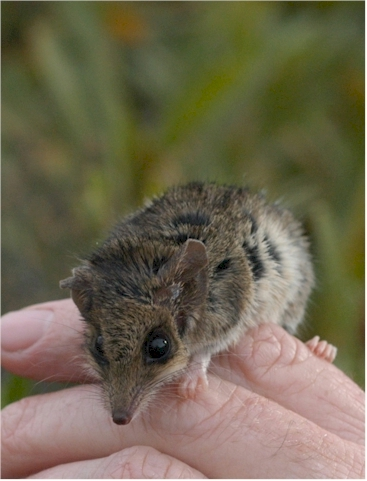
Sminthopsis murina

The slender-tailed dunnart's breeding season begins in New South Wales between September and March each year, with the female breeding again after weaning the first offspring (B.J. Fox 1982). The female may live to breed a second year, although the male generally dies after mating. Gestation is for 12.5 days with weaning at 60–65 days. The litter size is usually 8–10 joeys. In unfavourable conditions and to save food, torpor is sometimes a factor in the species' life habit, but it is only documented in areas of extreme environmental conditions. The species is nocturnal.

== Diet ==
An opportunistic arthropod feeder, found that a preference for beetles and moths with other prey less eaten than what was available.

== Bibliography ==
- Groves, C. P. (2005). Wilson, D. E.; Reeder, D. M. (eds.). Mammal Species of the World: A Taxonomic and Geographic Reference (3rd ed.). Baltimore: Johns Hopkins University Press. p. 35. ISBN 0-801-88221-4. OCLC 62265494.
- Menkhorst, Peter W. (1995). Mammals of Victoria. Oxford Press. pp. 66–67. ISBN 0-19-553733-5.
- Fox, B.J., Whitford, D. 1982. Polyoestry in a predictable coastal environment: Reproduction, Growth and Development in Sminthopsis murina (Dasyuridae, marsupialia).
- Fox, B.J., Archer, E. 1984. The diets of Sminthopsis murina and Antechinus stuartii (Marsupialia:Dasyuridae) in Sympatry. Australian Wildlife Resources 11:235-248.
