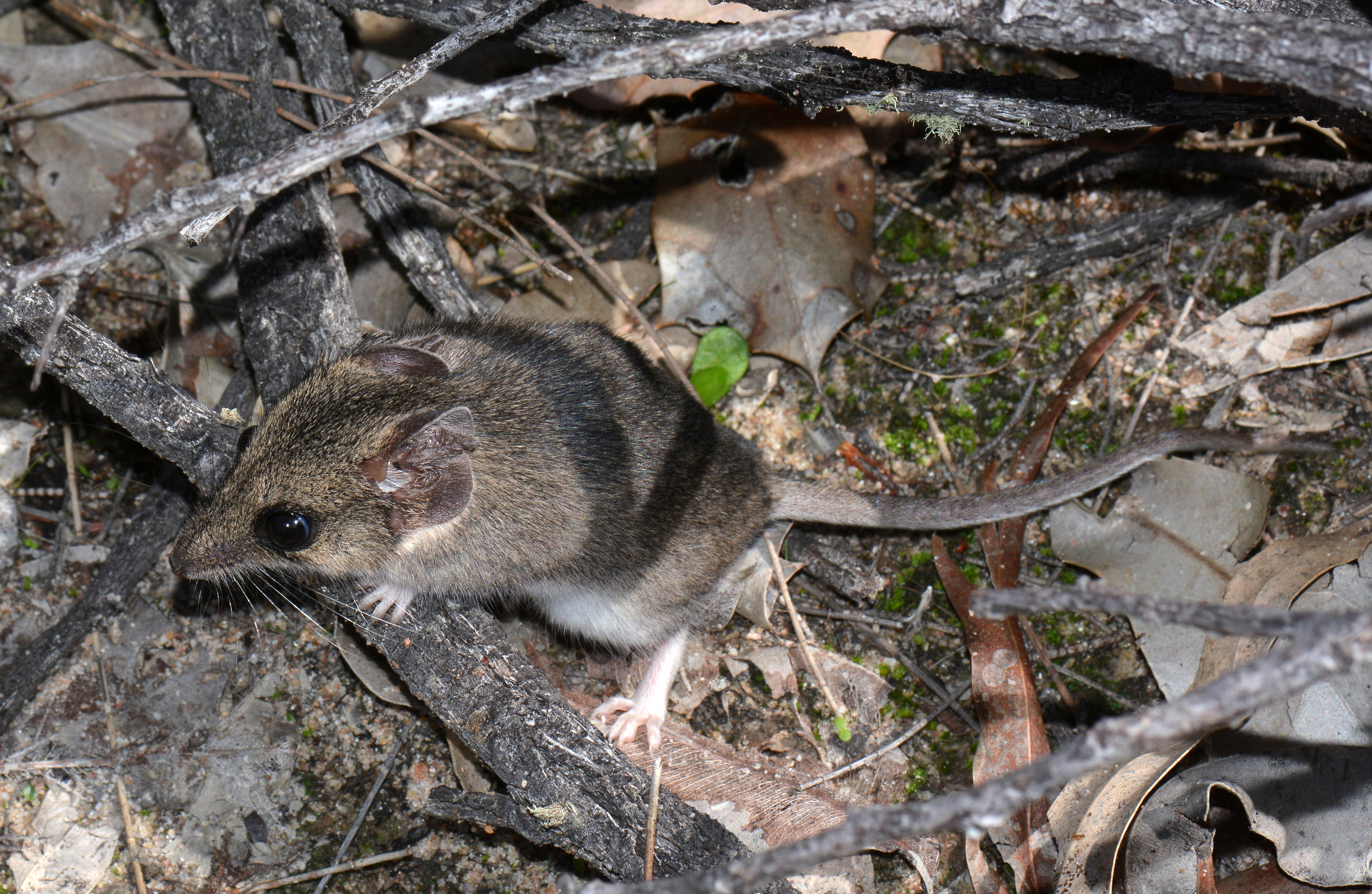

Conservation status
- Least Concern (IUCN 3.1)

Scientific classification
- Kingdom: Animalia
- Phylum: Chordata
- Class: Mammalia
- Infraclass: Marsupialia
- Order: Dasyuromorphia
- Family: Dasyuridae
- Genus: Sminthopsis
- Species: S. gilberti

Binomial name
- Sminthopsis gilberti Kitchener, Stoddart & Henry, 1984
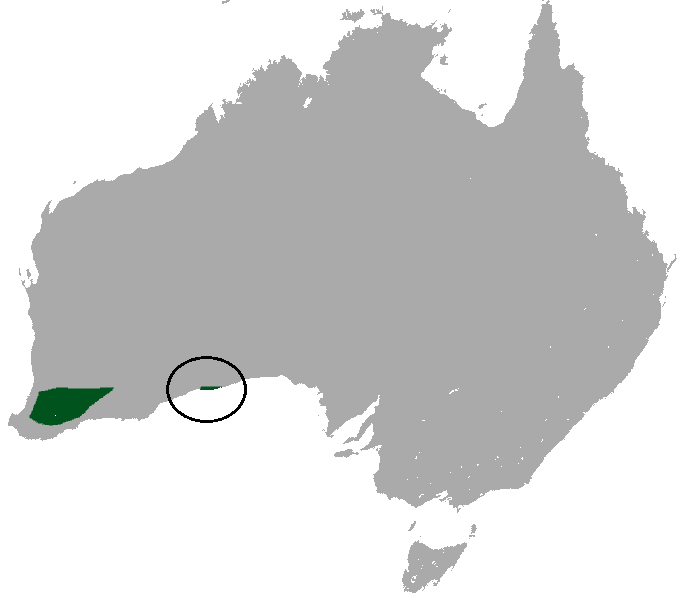
- Gilbert's dunnart range

= Gilbert's dunnart =

Species of marsupial

Gilbert's dunnart (Sminthopsis gilberti) is a dunnart, described in 1984. The length from snout to tail being 15.5–18 cm (6.1–7.1 in) of which the head and body are 8–9 cm (3.1–3.5 in) and the tail 7.5–9 cm (3.0–3.5 in). The hind foot size is 18 mm (0.71 in), the ear length is 21 mm (0.83 in) and with the weight is 14–25 g (0.49–0.88 oz).

== Distribution and habitat ==
Gilbert's dunnart is found in the southern wheat belt of Western Australia close to Perth and the Swan River, as well as the Roe plain near the South Australian border. The habitat it inhabits consists of heath and heathy forest and is abundant on coastal rangers, dry sclerophyll forest, semi-arid woodlands, and mallee scrub.

== Social organisation and breeding ==
This nocturnal species nests in hollows above ground or dense bush. Gilbert's dunnart breeds from September until December and young are weaned in January or February.

== Diet ==
Gilbert's dunnart primarily eats insects.
