= Managalas Conservation Area =

Community Conserved Area

The Managalas Conservation Area (MCA) is a Protected Area in Northern (Oro) Province of Papua New Guinea. The MCA was declared in March 2017 after significant community support largely from Rainforest Foundation Norway through local NGO Partners with Melanesians. The MCA covers an area of 214,696ha (though earlier reported as 360,000ha) making it the largest Conservation Area in Papua New Guinea.

== Physical Setting ==
The core of the MCA is the Managalas Plateau, a feature formed by volcanic lava flows and ash fall, but the MCA stretches from near the coast (East) to the peaks of the Owen Stanley Range (West), the peak of the Hydrographers Range and edge of Mount Lamington (North) and the Sibium Mountains (South). With such a diverse elevation range, the MCA protects portions of several important forest types. One of the locally endemic species is the Queen Alexandra's Birdwing Butterfly

== Cultural Setting ==
The MCA is home to six language groups consisting of 152 clans who are the customary owners of the land. Through the process of developing consensus for the MCA, the clans formed 11 Community Based Organisations (CBOs) to reflect the local cultural wishes. These CBOs are represented by the Managalas Conservation Foundation, a local NGO formed solely for the purpose of guiding the conservation activities of the MCA.

== Conservation Activities ==
Conservation Activities in the MCA have recently received additional support from the European Union with a focus on sustainable livelihoods for the communities of the MCA.

== See also ==
- Conservation in Papua New Guinea
- YUS Conservation Area
- Tonda Wildlife Management Area
- List of protected areas of Papua New Guinea
