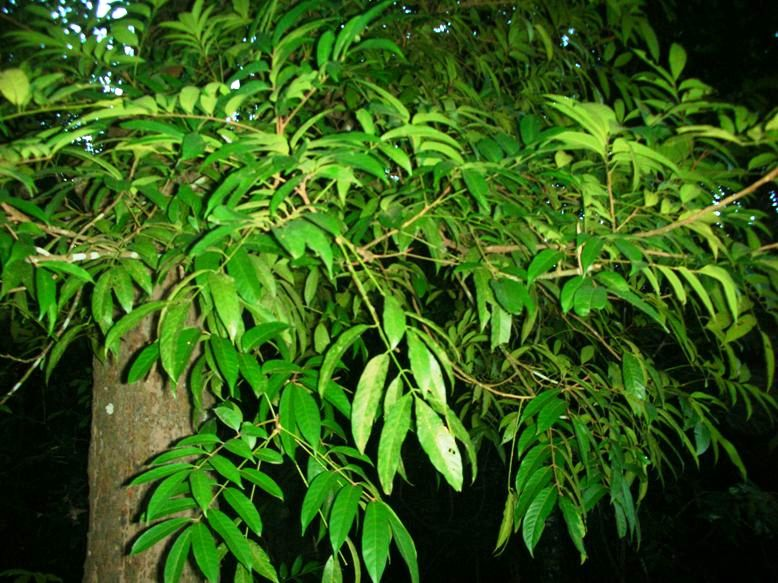

Conservation status
- Least Concern (IUCN 3.1)

Scientific classification
- Kingdom: Plantae
- Clade: Embryophytes
- Clade: Tracheophytes
- Clade: Spermatophytes
- Clade: Angiosperms
- Clade: Eudicots
- Clade: Rosids
- Order: Sapindales
- Family: Meliaceae
- Genus: Aglaia
- Species: A. spectabilis

Binomial name
- Aglaia spectabilis (Miq.) S.S.Jain & Bennet

Synonyms
- Aglaia dasyclada F.C.How & T.C.Chen; Aglaia gigantea (Pierre) Pellegr.; Aglaia hiernii M.V.Viswan. & K.Ramach.; Aglaia ridleyi (King) Pannell; Amoora dasyclada (F.C.How & T.C.Chen) C.Y.Wu; Amoora gigantea Pierre; Amoora ridleyi King; Amoora spectabilis Miq.; Amoora stellatosquamosa C.Y.Wu & H.Li; Amoora wallichii King; Aphanamixis wallichii (King) Harid. & R.R.Rao; Sphaerosacme spectabilis Royle

= Aglaia spectabilis =

Species of tree found near the Pacific and Indian coasts

Aglaia spectabilis is a species of tree in the family Meliaceae, found from the Santa Cruz Islands in the southwest Pacific to Queensland (Australia), Southeast Asia, Yunnan (Zhōngguó/China) and the Indian subcontinent. It grows from a 1m shrub to an emergent 40m tall tree, depending on the habitat. Its wood is commercially exploited as timber, but otherwise is of poor quality with limited use. The fruit are eaten, and used in folk medicine. The seeds are large in comparison to other plants, and a major source of dispersal of the species are hornbills eating the fruit, flying away from the tree and regurgitating the seeds.

== Description ==
This plant grows as a tree to 40m tall. The tree trunk has large plank-like buttresses, with a greyish-white to brown bark that flakes in squarish large scales. When a blaze, a cut on the trunk to reveal inner bark and wood, is made there is usually quite obvious but meagre milky exudate from the fine layers, with a faint odour of incense often apparent. The twigs and leaves also produce milk. Reddish-brown to pale-brown stellate hairs of scales densely cover the twigs, petioles, rachis, petiolules, inflorescences, infructescences, calyxes, and outside of petals and fruits. The lower leaflet surface has a variable cover of hairs, from few to many.

Rather large blade on lateral leaflets, from as little as 3cm, though usually 9–40 cm long and some 3–17 cm wide, with the subprominent lateral veins curving inside the margin, but they do not form loops. The leaves are quite large, some 50-135 cm long. The inflorescences are up to 40 cm long. The flowers are small; some 2-7 by 2-6 mm in size; lobes of the calyx are rounded at the apex with their outer surface densely clothed in stellate hairs; the 3 pinkish-yellow petals are partially clothed; about 9 stamens; cup-shaped staminal tube roughly 3mm long, 2.5mm wide; protruding beyond the aperture are 6 anthers. The infructescence is some 9-13cm long. In the dehiscent, subglobose to obovoid fruit, the red aril/sarcotesta completely encloses the seed; size of fruit is roughly 6-9 by 5.5-9 cm; up to 1cm thick pericarp with white latex or milk; 3 locules each of which have 1 or 0 seeds. Seed (5-6mm long) germination occurs in 20-28 days. In the roughly paraboloid-shaped cotyledons of the seedling, the face of the cotyledon forms base of paraboloid, the face is in a plane at right angles with the seed's long axis. Primary pair of leaves roughly 10-15cm long. The terminal bud is clothed in stellate hairs or scales at the 10th leaf stage.

In Australia flowering is in February, with fruiting occurring from November to February. In China the flowers appear from September to November, with fruiting in October.

== Taxonomy ==
A prominent expert on Aglaia, British botanist Caroline Mary Pannell, states that "DNA sequencing is providing evidence that some widespread species of Aglaia should be subdivided. So far, we only have sequences from the western part of the range of Aglaia spectabilis. Future work might lead to the eastern populations being recognised as distinct". This article endeavours to represent the situation at March 2021.

This species was described by the two botanists S.S. Jain (1952-) and Sigamony Stephen Richard Bennett (1940-2009), who in 1987 published a paper in Indian Journal of Forestry; Quarterly Journal of Forestry, Agriculture, Horticulture, Natural History, Wild Life, Field Botany, and Allied Subjects (Dehra Dun). They were "standing on the shoulders" of the Dutch botanist Friedrich Anton Wilhelm Miquel (1811–71), an expert on Malesian flora, who published his species Amoora spectablis in 1868 in the journal Annales Musei Botanici Lugduno-Batavi (Amsterdam).

== Distribution ==
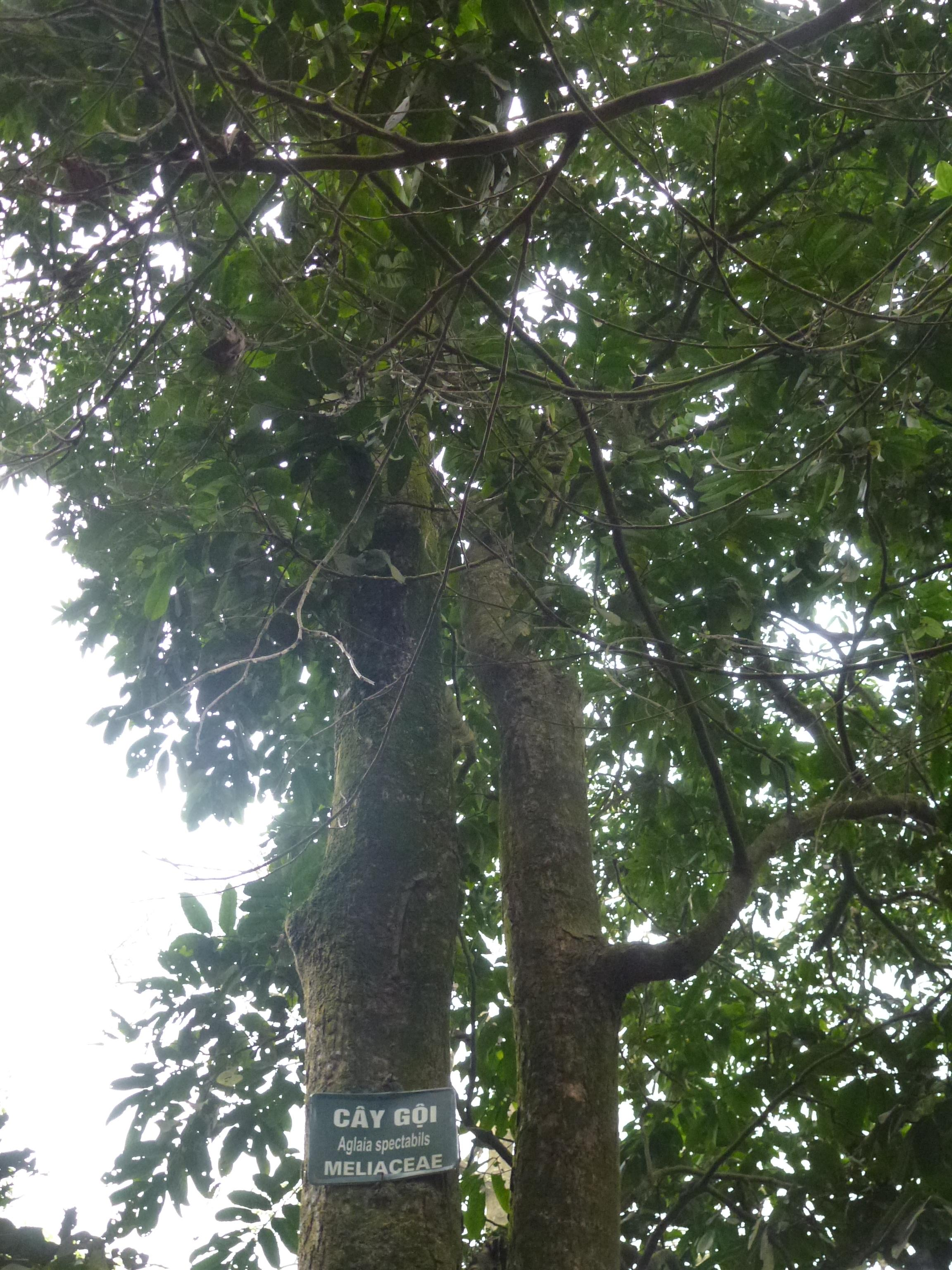
Aglaia spectabilis at Hùng Temple, Vietnam

Aglaia spectabilis is native to a region from north Queensland (Australia) to Southeast Asia and Yunnan Zhōngguó/China) and the Eastern Himalayan region. Countries and regions in which the species occurs are: Solomon Islands (including Santa Cruz Islands); Papua Niugini (Bougainville, Bismarck Archipelago, Eastern New Guinea); Australia (Cape York from the Rocky River east of Coen north to Lockerbie Scrub); Indonesia (West Papua, Nusa Tenggara, Sulawesi, Kalimantan, Sumatra); Philippines; Malaysia (Sabah [widespread], Sarawak [uncommon], Peninsular Malaysia); Thailand; Cambodia; Laos; Vietnam; Zhōngguó/China (south and southeast Yunnan: Xichou, Xishuangbanna); Myanmar; India (including Andaman Islands, Assam); Bangladesh; Bhutan; East Himalaya.

== Habitat & ecology ==
In Australia this plant grows in gallery forests, rainforests, coast riverine and deciduous mesophyll vine forests, favoured by a marked dry season, occurring on red soils derived from mixture of basic rocks and ferruginous sandstone. In Southeast Asia and Yunnan it grows in dense forests, abundant on red soils, often cultivated as a fruit or shade tree. The species occurs from sea level to 100m altitude.

Fruit pigeons are believed to disperse the seeds in Australia.

Four large-gaped pigeons at the Crater Mountain Wildlife Management Area (Eastern Highlands Province, Papua Niugini), are known to eat the fruit of this species: Ptilinopus superbus (Superb Fruit-Dove), Ducula rufigaster (Purple-tailed Imperial-Pigeon), D. zoeae (Zoe Imperial-Pigeon), Gymnophaps albertisii (Papuan Mountain-Pigeon).

In Ta Xua Nature Reserve, northwestern Vietnam, the tree, which is classified as threatened, occurs moderately frequently in the fully protected core zone, but is far less frequent in the low intensity forest use buffer zone and the regenerating formerly-cultivated restoration zone. Regeneration, numbers of seedlings and young trees, occurred in the core zone, but was quite rare in the other two zones. Where it occurred it was in the vicinity of mature A. spectabilis trees.

The Khao Yai National Park, northeastern Thailand, preserves rainforest at altitudes from 250 to 1351m altitude. A. spectablis is a canopy tree here, growing around 35m tall with a diameter at breast height of 120cm. It is deciduous with the first leaves appearing around March to April. Inflorescences start to grow around three weeks after the leaves. Fruit take 13-4 months to mature, the seeds of this species is one of the largest of plants growing in the national park. The animal consumers of fruit and dispersers of seeds are often numerous and diverse, however large seeds can only be dispersed by a small number of animals. This limited number of dispersers may make taxa more vulnerable to change and extinction. Frugivores dispersing this species' seeds were four hornbill and one pigeon species: Buceros bicornis (great hornbill), Aceros undulatus (wreathed hornbill), Anorrhinus austeni (brown hornbill), Anthracoceros albirostris (oriental pied hornbill), and Ducula badia (mountain imperial pigeon). Two squirrel species, Ratufa bicolor (black giant squirrel), and Callosciurus finlaysonii (variable squirrel), are significant consumers of the fruit but they drop the seeds to the forest floor, not dispersing them. Seeds on the floor below the trees are heavily predated on by three mammals: Hystrix brachyura (Malayan porcupine), Maxomys surifer (red spiny rat), and C. finlaysonii. This has the result that the regurgitation of the seeds by the hornbills is the major source of seedling plants.

The Pakke Wildlife Sanctuary, in Arunachal Pradesh, northeastern India, has tropical semi-evergreen rainforest, A. spectabilis is an emergent tree, growing up to 40m tall. Fruit of the species appear from May to August, peaking in June and July. Investigating the hypothesis of Kitamura et al. that seed size influences which frugivores eat fruit and how dispersal happens, various trees were watched. The A. spectabilis seeds were eaten by six species: Buceros bicornis (great hornbill), Rhyticeros undulatus (wreathed hornbill), Anthracoceros albirostris (oriental pied hornbill), Ducula badia (mountain imperial pigeon), Ratufa bicolor (black giant squirrel), and Callosciurus pygerythrus (Irrawaddy squirrel). Like the situation in Khao Yai National Park, only the hornbills and the pigeon acted as dispersers. The hypothesis was supported by the evidence.

The village of Jayanti is in the Buxa Tiger Reserve (West Bengal), eastern India), and is surrounded by a forest dominated by Shorea robusta. A. spectabilis is one of the second rank of dominant trees.

== Conservation status ==
While the IUCN has listed the plant as Least Concern, there are factors that indicate threats to this species. While having a wide range and a variety of habitat, timber use and loss of habitat by agricultural expansion threatens the tree. These threats are likely to be patchy. In the Red Data Book of Vietnam (listing threatened taxa) the species is listed as vulnerable.

== Vernacular names ==
- bâng' kèw dâmrei, ba:y phouvèang, pang' kachak' (Khmer language)
- gội nếp (Vietnamese language)
- 曲梗崖摩, qu geng ya mo Standard Chinese
- pathi (Bingni/Nishi language, Arunachal Pradesh, India)
- amari (Assamese language)
- lali fruit, West Bengal, India
- amoora, Cape York cedar, Pacific maple (Australia)

== Uses ==
In Southeast Asia people eat the fruit, and the larger roots/buttresses are used to make oxen-cart wheels. Otherwise the wood is of inferior quality, suitable only for interior use. The species is however logged for timber to be used in housing construction, plywood and veneer, and to produce sports equipment, and tools. It is used widely to make furniture.

The Bangni people of East Kameng District, Arunachal Pradesh, northeast India, eat the raw fruit in their ethnomedicine to give relief from cough.

People in the Chirang Reserve Forest (part of Manas Biosphere Reserve, Assam, northeast India) use the leaves and fruit to make a cold or hot infusion to treat worm infection, the leaf infusion is also used to treat fever. The same source reports other use elsewhere of the leaf infusion is to treat skin allergies and diarrhoea, while the bark infusion has been reported to treat cough.

In West Bengal's Buxa Tiger Reserve, the villagers living there harvest lali fruit to use for decorative purposes in the months of February and March.
