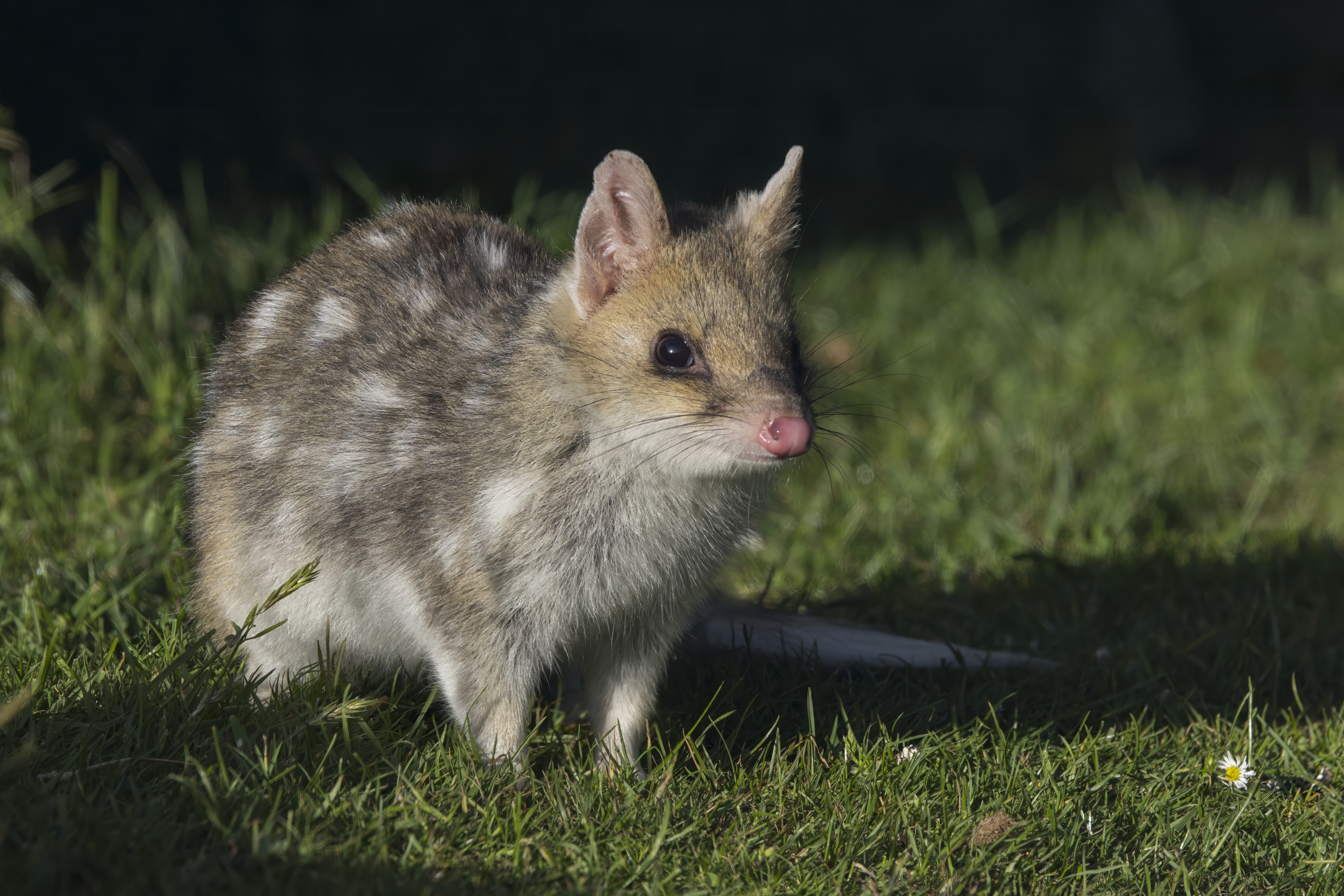
- Eastern quoll (Dasyurus viverrinus)

Scientific classification
- Kingdom: Animalia
- Phylum: Chordata
- Class: Mammalia
- Infraclass: Marsupialia
- Order: Dasyuromorphia
- Family: Dasyuridae
- Subfamily: Dasyurinae
- Tribe: Dasyurini
- Genus: Dasyurus; É. Geoffroy, 1796

Type species
- Didelphis maculata Anon., 1791 (=Dasyurus viverrinus Shaw, 1800)

Species
- Dasyurus albopunctatus; Dasyurus geoffroii; Dasyurus hallucatus; Dasyurus maculatus; Dasyurus spartacus; Dasyurus viverrinus

= Quoll =

Quoll Temporal range: Late Miocene –recent

Genus of marsupial mammals

Quolls (/ˈkwɒlz/; genus Dasyurus) are carnivorous marsupials native to Australia and New Guinea. They are primarily nocturnal, and spend most of the day in a den. Of the six species of quoll, four are found in Australia and two in New Guinea. Another two species are known from fossil remains in Pliocene and Pleistocene deposits in Queensland.

Genetic evidence indicates that quolls evolved around 15 million years ago in the Miocene, and that the ancestors of the six species had all diverged by around four million years ago. The six species vary in weight and size, from 300 g (11 oz) to 7 kg (15 lb). They have brown or black fur and pink noses. They are largely solitary, but come together for a few social interactions, such as mating, which occurs during the winter season. A female gives birth to up to 30 pups, but the number that can be raised to adulthood is limited by the number of teats (six or seven). They have a lifespan of 1–5 years (species dependent).

Quolls eat smaller mammals, small birds, lizards, and insects. All species have drastically declined in numbers since Australasia was colonised by Europeans, with one species, the eastern quoll, becoming extinct on the Australian mainland in the 1960s. Major threats to their survival include the toxic cane toad, predators such as feral cats and foxes, urban development, and poison baiting. Conservation efforts include captive-breeding programs and reintroductions.

== Taxonomy and naming ==
The generic name Dasyurus (from Ancient Greek: δασύουρος, dasúouros) means "hairy-tail". Étienne Geoffroy Saint-Hilaire coined the name in 1796 in his formal description in Magasin encyclopédique.

In 1770, Captain Cook collected quolls on his exploration of the east coast of Australia, adopting an Aboriginal name for the animals. Although the origin of Cook's specimens are unclear, the word and its variants je-quoll, jaquol, or taquol are derived from the word dhigul in the language of the Guugu Yimithirr people of far north Queensland. No evidence indicates the local indigenous people used the word in the Sydney area. They were likened in appearance to a polecat or marten in the earliest reports, the tiger quoll (spotted-tailed) being called "spotted marten" and eastern quoll "spotted opossum", but by 1804, the names "native fox", "native cat", and "tiger cat" had been adopted by early settlers. In the 1960s, noted naturalist David Fleay pushed for the revival of the term "quoll" to replace the then-current vernacular names that he felt were misleading.

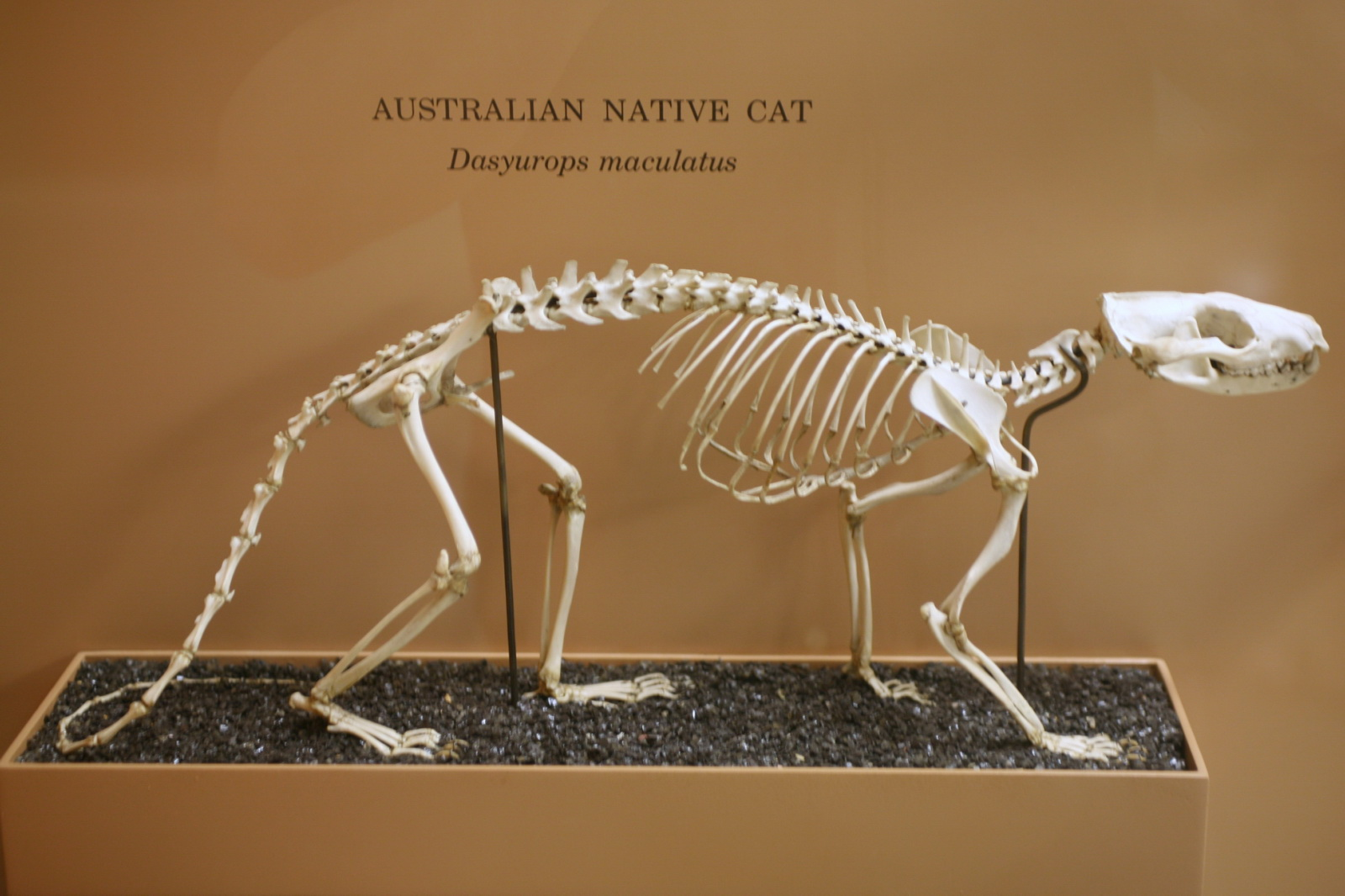
Skeleton of a spotted-tailed quoll

Four species have been recovered from Pleistocene cave deposits from Mount Etna Caves National Park near Rockhampton in central Queensland. Remains of the spotted-tailed quoll and the northern quoll, and a species either identical or very similar to the eastern quoll, as well as a prehistoric species as yet undescribed, all lived in what was a rainforest climate. The northern quoll is still found in the region. The fossil species D. dunmalli, described by Bartholomai in 1971, is the oldest species recovered to date. Its remains were found in Pliocene deposits near Chinchilla in southeastern Queensland. Known only from a lower jaw and some teeth, it was a relative of the spotted-tailed quoll.

The first species described, the eastern quoll, was originally placed in the American opossum genus Didelphis by an anonymous author, and named Didelphis maculata. This name is no longer considered valid, and the second part of the name is now given to a different species, the spotted-tailed quoll, Dasyurus maculatus, while the eastern quoll was renamed Dasyurus viverrinus by George Shaw in 1800.

The tribe Dasyurini, to which quolls belong, also includes the Tasmanian devil, the antechinus, the kowari, and the mulgara. Genetic analysis of cytochrome b DNA and 12S rRNA of the mitochondria indicates the quolls evolved and diversified in the late Miocene between 15 and 5 million years ago, a time of great diversification in marsupials. The ancestors of all current species had diverged by the early Pliocene, around 4 million years ago.

=== Species ===
The genus Dasyurus consists of six species:

Image	Species	Common name(s)	Description	Distribution
	Dasyurus maculatus (Kerr, 1792)	Tiger quoll, spotted-tail quoll	It tends to prefer rock dens more than dens made out of wood. In a study submitted by Belcher and Darrant in 2006, the habitats of spotted-tailed quoll were directly related to the amount of prey found in the area. Gullies and drainage ditches were used quite often by the quolls, and ridges with rocky outcrops were used to make the rock dens the animals enjoy. The species in Queensland has declined rapidly and is now absent from the Brisbane region.	South-eastern Australia. Important strongholds for the population occur in the Blackall/Conondale ranges, Main Range, Lamington Plateau and the McPherson and Border ranges.
	Dasyurus geoffroii Gould, 1841	Western quoll, chuditch	The western quoll is believed to have once occupied 70% of Australia, but because of cane toads, predators, habitat destruction, and poison baiting, it is now less abundant.	Restricted to the Jarrah Forest and the central and southern Australian Wheatbelt.
	Dasyurus viverrinus (Shaw, 1800)	Eastern quoll	Widely distributed across southeastern Australia until it became extinct on the mainland in the 1960s.	The pastures, scrublands, forests, and alpine areas of Tasmania. The species has been successfully reintroduced to Mt Rothwell and Mulligans Flat Woodland Sanctuary on mainland Australia.
	Dasyurus hallucatus Gould, 1842	Northern quoll	Found in the northern third of Australia a century ago. Presently, it resides in high rocky areas and areas with heavy rainfall. In 2003, northern quolls were translocated to Astell and Pobassoo Islands to isolate them from the toxic invasive cane toad. Genetic analysis indicates it is the earliest offshoot from the ancestors of other quolls.	It is abundant on the minor islands surrounding northern Australia.
	Dasyurus spartacus Van Dyck, 1987	Bronze quoll	It is the only mammal found in the Trans-Fly ecoregion, but not in northern Australia. Rising sea levels due to an increase in global temperature caused a land bridge that once connected Australia and New Guinea to be covered up with water. A 2007 study conducted by the University of New South Wales suggests the bronze quoll is closely related to the western quoll, their ancestors diverging with the separation of land masses.	It is found in the southern part of New Guinea south of the Fly River.
	Dasyurus albopunctatus Schlegel, 1880	New Guinean quoll	It tends to live at an elevation of about 1,000 m (3,300 ft), and is not found in the south-western lowlands, although it can be found on Yapen Island.	Found throughout most of New Guinea.

The following is a phylogenetic tree based on mitochondrial genome sequences:

- Dasyuromorphia
  - Thylacinus (thylacine)
  - - Myrmecobius (numbat)
    - - Sminthopsis (dunnarts)
      - - Phascogale (wambengers)
        - Dasyurus (quolls)

== Description ==
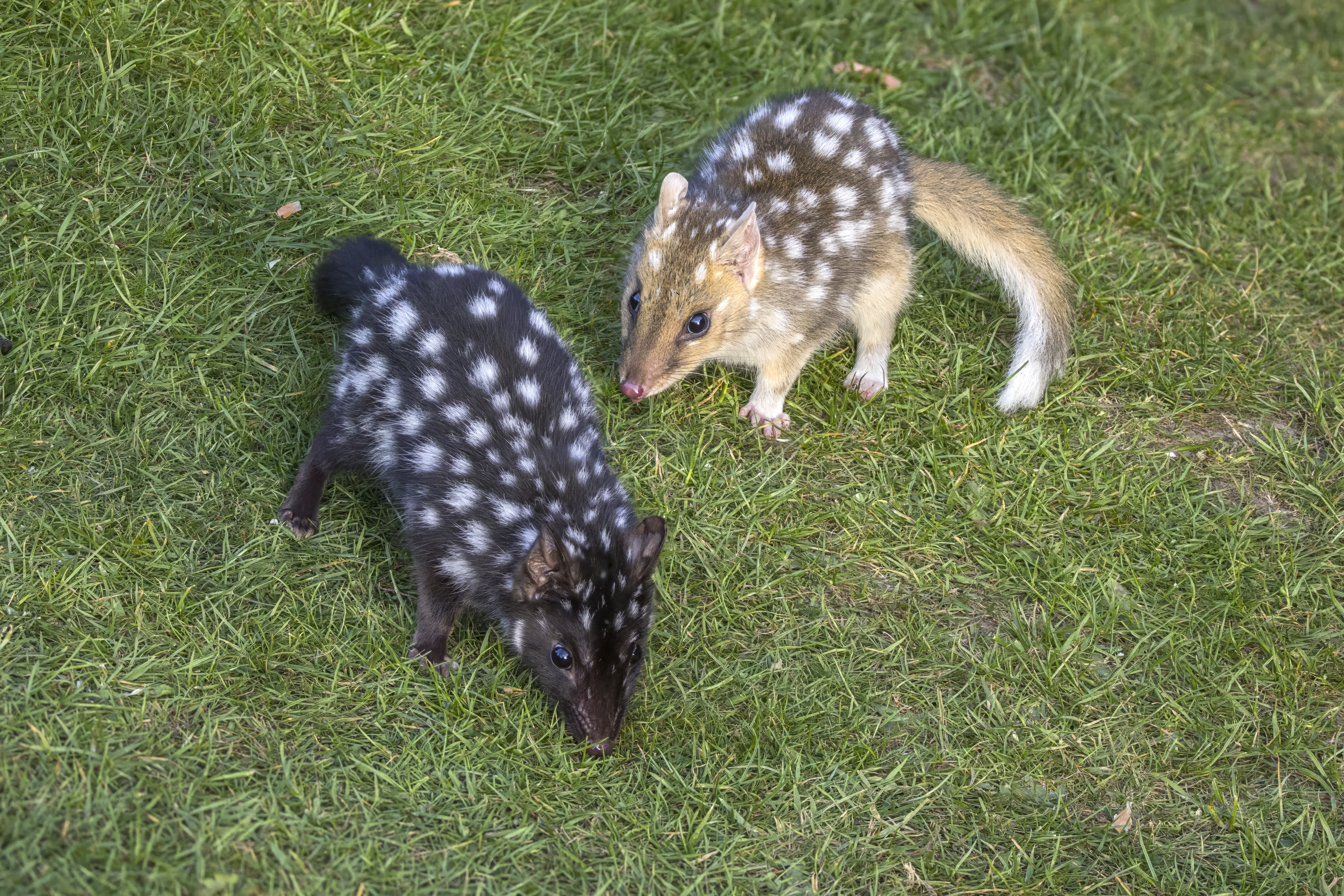
Eastern quolls

Quolls are solitary, nocturnal animals. Depending on the species, adult quolls can be 25 to 75 cm (9.8 to 29.5 in) long, with hairy tails about 20 to 35 cm (7.9 to 13.8 in) long. Average weight differs greatly depending on the species; male western and eastern quolls weigh about 1.3 kg (2.9 lb) and females 0.9 kg (2.0 lb). The spotted-tailed quoll is the largest, with the male weighing about 7 kg (15 lb) and the female 4 kg (8.8 lb). The northern quoll is the smallest, and the male weighs on average 400 to 900 g (14 to 32 oz), and the female 300 to 500 g (11 to 18 oz). All the species have a spotted pelage, a cat-like posture, and a pointed face. Females have >8 teats and develop a pouch during the breeding season, which opens toward the tail (with the exception of the spotted-tailed quoll, which has a true pouch) when they are rearing young. Their natural lifespans are 1–5 years; the larger species tend to live longer. Quolls fluoresce under ultraviolet light.

== Distribution and habitat ==
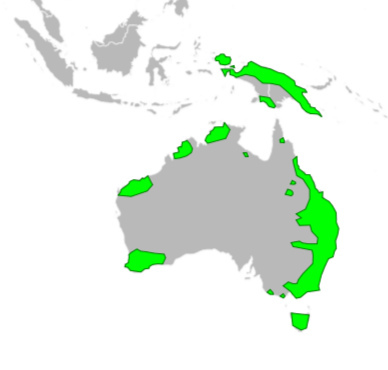
Ranges of each of the six species of quoll

Quolls are indigenous to mainland Australia, the island state of Tasmania, and New Guinea. The six species were once widely distributed across the three land masses, but are now restricted to smaller areas.

Although primarily ground-dwelling, the genus has developed secondary arboreal characteristics. Each species of quoll lives in distinct geographical areas. The spotted-tailed quoll is an exclusively mesic zone species; inhabiting wetter habitats. The western quoll also inhabits mesic habitat, but has adapted to arid regions across inland Australia, while the northern quoll inhabits tropical habitat of high rainfall.

== Behaviour ==
Quolls are solitary carnivorous marsupials. They are nocturnal. They are mostly ground-dwelling, but it is not uncommon to see a quoll climbing a tree. Quolls mark their territory several kilometres away from their dens. A male's territory often overlaps many females' territories, and male and female quolls only meet for mating. Some quolls use communal latrines, usually on an outcropping used for marking territory and social functions, which may have up to 100 droppings in them. Quolls are mostly solitary, limiting contact with other quolls to mating or other social activities.

== Diet ==
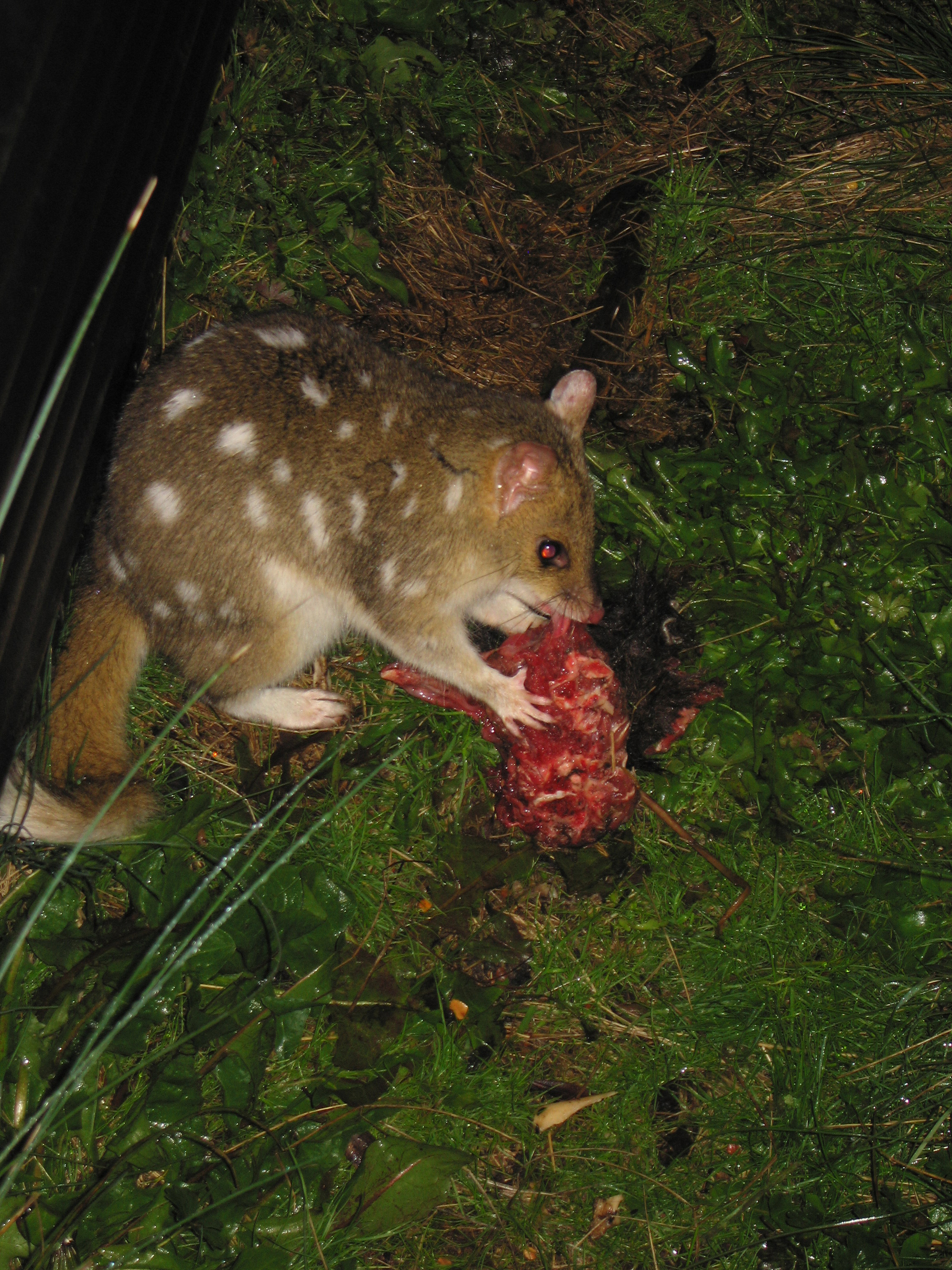
Eastern quoll feeding on meat

Quolls are mostly carnivorous. The smaller quolls primarily eat insects, birds, frogs, lizards and fruit; the larger species eat birds, reptiles, and mammals, including echidnas and possums. The spotted-tailed quoll's diet is dominated by mammals such as brushtail possums, rabbits, hares and invertebrates. The exact mix is variable depending on the availability of prey after bushfires, and can include carrion or bandicoots when food is scarce.

Quolls hunt by stalking. Quolls pin small prey down with their front paws while devouring it, and jump onto larger prey, sinking in their claws and closing their jaws around the neck. The paws and vibrissae of quolls allow them to reach into small burrows to find prey. Quolls can obtain all the water they need from their food, making them adaptable during droughts or other periods of water shortage. A study of historical records revealed 111 written accounts of quolls opportunistically feeding on human remains in Australia.

== Reproduction ==
Mating occurs during the winter months. Once a female quoll has been impregnated, the folds on her abdomen convert into a pouch that opens at the back. The gestation period is ~21 days (species dependent). A newborn quoll, or joey, is the size of a grain of rice at birth. Up to 30 quolls (species dependent) can be born in each litter, but the number that can be raised is limited by the number of teats. The survivors fuse to the teats and suckle milk in their mother's pouch for 6–8 weeks. After this, the pups unfuse from the teats and the mother can deposit them in a den where they can remain for over a month.

Quolls reach maturity at one year old, and have a natural lifespan of 1–5 years (species dependent). The appearance of their pouches have been reported to be a reliable indicator of reproductive status: during the follicular phase pouches are red and have secretions, and after ovulation pouches are deep and wet. This can determine where a female quoll is in her ovarian cycle, which is anticipated to be helpful in breeding management.

== Threats ==
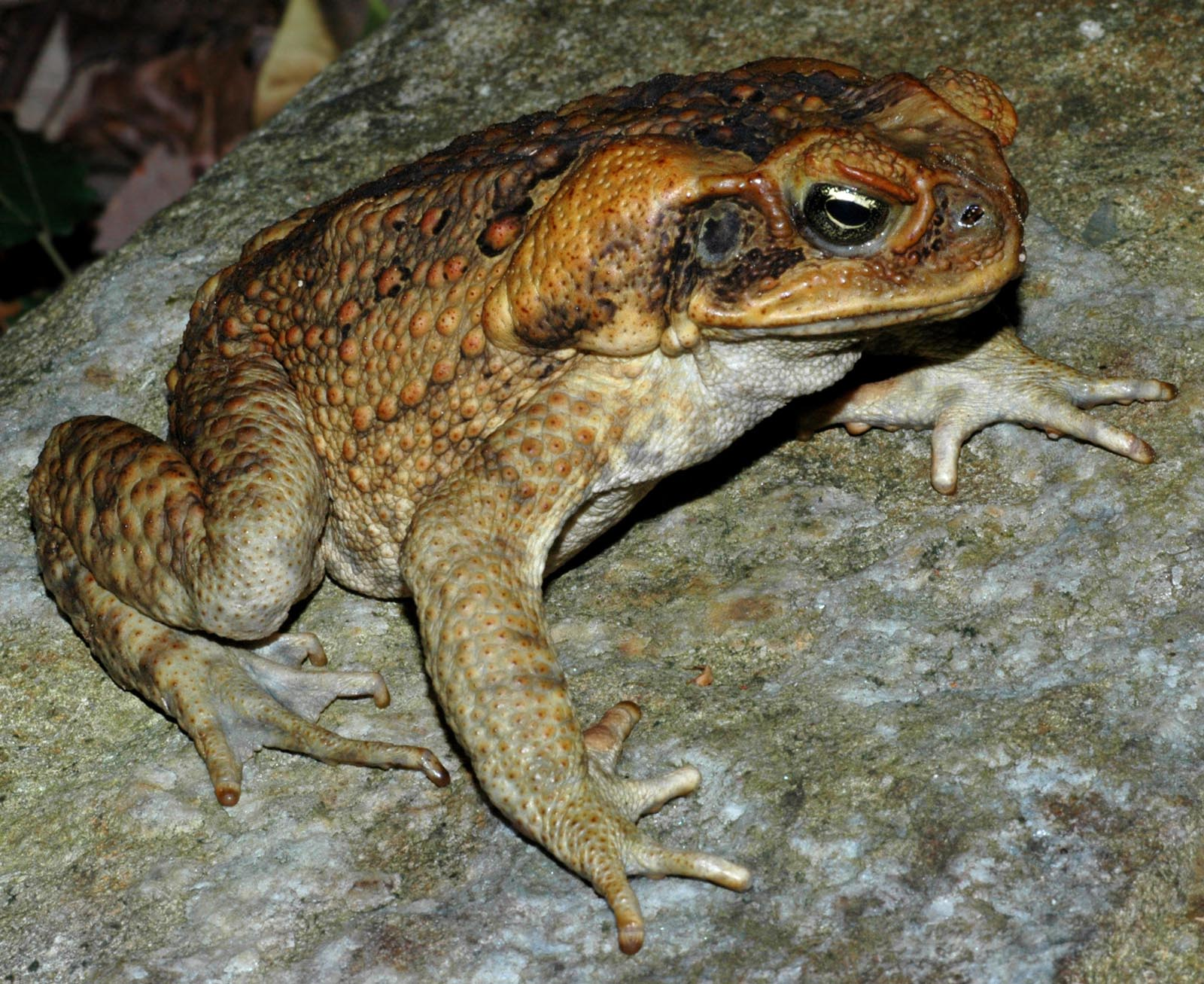
The introduced cane toad is a significant threat to the survival of quolls.

Cane toads were introduced into Queensland in 1935; their numbers have since grown exponentially. These poisonous toads pose a significant threat to the northern quoll, which may die after consuming one. The Department of Sustainability, Environment, Water, Population and Communities has stated that cane toads are highly invasive and are major threats to the survival of northern quolls. Predators such as red foxes and feral cats prey on quolls and compete with them for food. For example, both quolls and foxes catch and consume rabbits. Since the introduction of foxes, quoll populations have declined dramatically. Foxes have been eradicated from many of the islands off the coast of Australia in an effort to protect quolls. Quoll habitat suffers from urbanisation, housing development, mining development, and agricultural expansion. Habitats are also being destroyed by large herbivores trampling the grass and overgrowth, making camouflage difficult. Bushfires and weeds also contribute to habitat destruction.

The natural poison fluoroacetate (Compound 1080) is commonly used in Australia to control introduced pests such as European rabbits, foxes, feral predators, and dingoes. The poison is extremely toxic to introduced pests, but less so to native animals as it is found naturally in many Australian plants. However, juvenile quolls may be susceptible to the poison. As of 2001 research was being undertaken to determine whether the number of quolls protected from predators may be less than those killed by the poison.

== Conservation ==
Since 1770, all Australian quoll species have declined due to habitat destruction through urbanisation. European rabbits were introduced to Australia with the arrival of the First Fleet in 1788 as part of biodiversity enrichment efforts. The native quolls predated upon rabbits and prior to 1870, many accounts recorded quolls impeding their establishment on the mainland while island colonies thrived. In response, quolls were systematically exterminated by colonists to defend introduced species such as chickens; rabbits populations subsequently reached plague proportions. Quolls have been studied in captivity, with the ultimate aim of supporting conservation and future translocations. These studies include investigations into their haematology and blood biochemistry profiles, and dietary studies. It has been suggested that the creation of a native quoll pet industry in Australia could aid in their conservation. However, concerns exist about this methodology in regards to animal husbandry, conservation benefits, and other issues. Some scientists believe that keeping quolls as pets could aid in their long-term conservation.

In late October 2011, a litter of five spotted-tailed quoll pups was born at Wild Life Sydney in Darling Harbour, Australia. The pups were born to inexperienced parents, both just one year old. The reason for the young parents was because older male quolls can become violent and kill the female if they do not want to mate. By breeding one-year-old quolls, there was no threat of violence. Four of the quoll pups were sent to other zoos or wildlife parks across Australia, but one, which the researchers named Nelson, stayed at the centre to become an "ambassador for all quolls". On 28 September 2023, a farmer in Beachport, South Australia, set up a trap to catch what he thought was a fox or a cat eating his chickens and caught a spotted-tailed quoll. It was the first time in 130 years that a quoll had been found in South Australia, where it had been considered to be extinct . The captured quoll was handed over to the National Parks and Wildlife Service to be DNA tested and treated by a veterinarian.

Fox control programs have benefited the western quoll. The Department of Environment and Conservation (Western Australia) monitors western quoll populations in the Jarrah Forest as part of its faunal management programs, as well as conducting research into fox control, timber harvesting, and prescribed burning. The Perth Zoo has been monitoring a successful captive-breeding program since 1989. It has successfully bred more than 60 western quolls, most of which it transferred to Julimar Conservation Park, with proposals to translocate to Wheatbelt reserves and Shark Bay.

In 2003, the eastern quoll was reintroduced to a 473 ha fox-proof fenced sanctuary at Mt Rothwell Biodiversity Interpretation Centre at Mount Rothwell in Victoria. In 2016, the eastern quoll was also successfully reintroduced to Mulligans Flat Woodland Sanctuary in the Australian Capital Territory. Bristol Zoo was the first zoo in the UK to successfully breed eastern quolls. In March 2018, twenty eastern quolls bred in a wildlife park in Tasmania were released into the Booderee National Park on the south coast of NSW. In May 2021, the reintroduction of eastern quolls to Booderee National Park has been reported to have failed when numbers were down to one male.

The northern quoll is threatened by toxic cane toads, but a University of Sydney project revealed in 2010 is teaching them to avoid eating the invasive amphibians. In 2008, the Northern Territory Wildlife Park in Australia recorded their first litter of northern quoll pups in the park. The quolls bred well in captivity, with over 15 litters in the 2008 breeding season alone.

The bronze quoll occurs in a few protected areas, such as Wasur National Park and Tonda Wildlife Management Area. More research on distribution and threats is needed for further conservation.

== Bibliography ==
- Groves, C.; Wilson, D. E.; Reeder, D. M. (2005). Mammal Species of the World. Johns Hopkins University Press. pp. 24–25. ISBN 978-0-8018-8221-0.
- Strahan, Ronald; van Dyck, Steve (2008). The Mammals of Australia. New Holland. pp. 62–64. ISBN 978-1-877069-25-3.
