= List of protected areas of Papua New Guinea =

Papua New Guinea is home to several protected areas, which receive protection because of their environmental, cultural or similar value.

The total area of Papua New Guinea protected territories is 14,330 km^{2} (5,530 sq mi), which amounts to approximately 3.07% of the country's territory. The total number of protected areas as 2018 is 71.

The effort by the PNG government to protect biodiversity has resulted in 44 existing terrestrial protected areas using the International Union for the Conservation of Nature and Natural Resources (IUCN) categories. These protected areas account for 1.6% of the total land area. A study of biodiversity identified a further 398 areas as candidates for conservation. This would increase the total protected areas to 16.8% of the total country area.

Included in the PNG protected area list, but not formally recognized by International Union for the Conservation of Nature and Natural Resources (IUCN) is the terrestrial Wildlife Management Area (WMA). WMA is an Integrated Conservation and Development Project (ICAD), which seeks to conserve biological diversity by involving landowners. The idea behind the project is that income generating activities, from the biological diversity would encourage people living in these areas to conserve, because such projects would link the value of these resources to living standard and also access to markets. The progress of WMA's is yet to be evaluated.

Papua New Guinea's first conservation area, the YUS Conservation Area, was established in 2009 on the Huon Peninsula, Morobe Province.

Apart from local conservation efforts, PNG is also a signatory to international conventions and treaties. These international treaties include. The International Plant Protection Convention (1951); Convention on the Prevention of Marine Pollution by Dumping of Wastes and Other Matter (1972); Convention on International Trade in Endangered Species of Wild Fauna and Flora (CITES); Ramsar Convention on Wetlands of International Importance Especially as Waterfowl Habitat (1992); Convention on Biological Diversity (1992) and the Convention on the Conservation of Migratory Species of Wild Animals. PNG is also in partnership with other nations in the Oceania region and is a signatory to the regional Convention on Conservation of Nature in the South Pacific (APIA Convention).

PNG has two listed Ramsar sites: Lake Kutubu and Tonda Wildlife Management Area.

== National parks ==
National parks of Papua New Guinea are distinguished by pristine, untouched environment.

Name	Location	Area	Notes	WDPA ID	Coordinates
Jimi (Ruti) Valley National Park	Jimi District, Jiwaka Province	42.06 km^{2} (16.24 sq mi)	Near Kawbenaberi.	15797	5°18′12.9″S 144°18′35.4″E
Loroko	West New Britain Province	0.75 km^{2} (0.29 sq mi)	Located near Valoka at Kimbe Bay of New Britain.	61530	5°26′20.9″S 150°31′00.8″E
Mc Adam National Park	Bulolo District, Morobe Province	21.06 km^{2} (8.13 sq mi)	Property rights in the park are disputed between Watut people and others.	838	7°16′17.6″S 146°37′31.1″E
Mt. Susu Nature Reserve at McAdam National Park	Bulolo District, Morobe Province	1.18 km^{2} (0.46 sq mi)		4197	7°16′17.6″S 146°37′31.1″E
Mt Wilhelm National Reserve / National Park	Chimbu Province	8.09 km^{2} (3.12 sq mi)		71364	05°48′S 145°02′E
Paga Hill National Park Scenic Reserve	National Capital District	0.14 km^{2} (0.054 sq mi)	Located at Paga Hill Estate, Port Moresby.	19716	9°28′44″S 147°08′58″E
Varirata National Park	National Capital District	10.28 km^{2} (3.97 sq mi)		839	9°27′49.5″S 147°21′36.5″E
Talele Island National Park	East New Britain Province	0.31 km^{2} (0.12 sq mi)	Islands in Lassul Bay	20057	4°09′37.2″S 151°34′28.7″E

== Managed reserves ==
- Zo-oimaga

== Wildlife management areas ==
In Papua New Guinea a wildlife management area is the simplest form of protected area, that protects an area of land or water while retaining full power to landowners to manage their land. WMAs are managed by an elected committee formed of customary landowners.

- Tonda Wildlife Management Area, Western Province
- Crater Mountain Wildlife Management Area, Eastern Highlands Province
- Kamiali Wildlife Management Area, Morobe Province
- Lake Kutubu Wildlife Management Area, Southern Highlands Province
- Lake Lavu, Wara Wildlife Management Area, Fergusson island, Milne Bay Province
- Oi Mada Wara Wildlife Management Area, Goodenough Island, Milne Bay Province
- Sulamesi Wildlife Management Area, Mount Bosavi, Southern Highlands Province
- Maza Wildlife Management Area, Western Province
- Aramba Wildlife Management Area, Western Province
- Wereaver Wildlife Management Area, Western Province
- Libano-Arisai Wildlife Management Area, Mount Bosavi, Southern Highlands Province
- Libano-Hose Wildlife Management Area, Mount Bosavi, Southern Highlands Province
- Neiru (Aird Hills) Wildlife Management Area, Gulf Province
- Baiyer River Wildlife Sanctuary, Baiyer, Western Highlands Province

== Conservation Areas ==
Under the PNG Conservation Areas Act (1978) another form of Protected Areas is a Conservation Area that also protects an area of land or water while retaining full power to landowners to manage their land. Management is overseen by a Management Committee in compliance with a Management Plan

- YUS Conservation Area, Morobe Province
- Managalas Conservation Area, Oro Province

== See also ==
- Baiyer River Sanctuary
- Conservation in Papua New Guinea
- Environmental issues in Papua New Guinea
