= Huon Peninsula montane rain forests =

Forest ecoregion in New Guinea

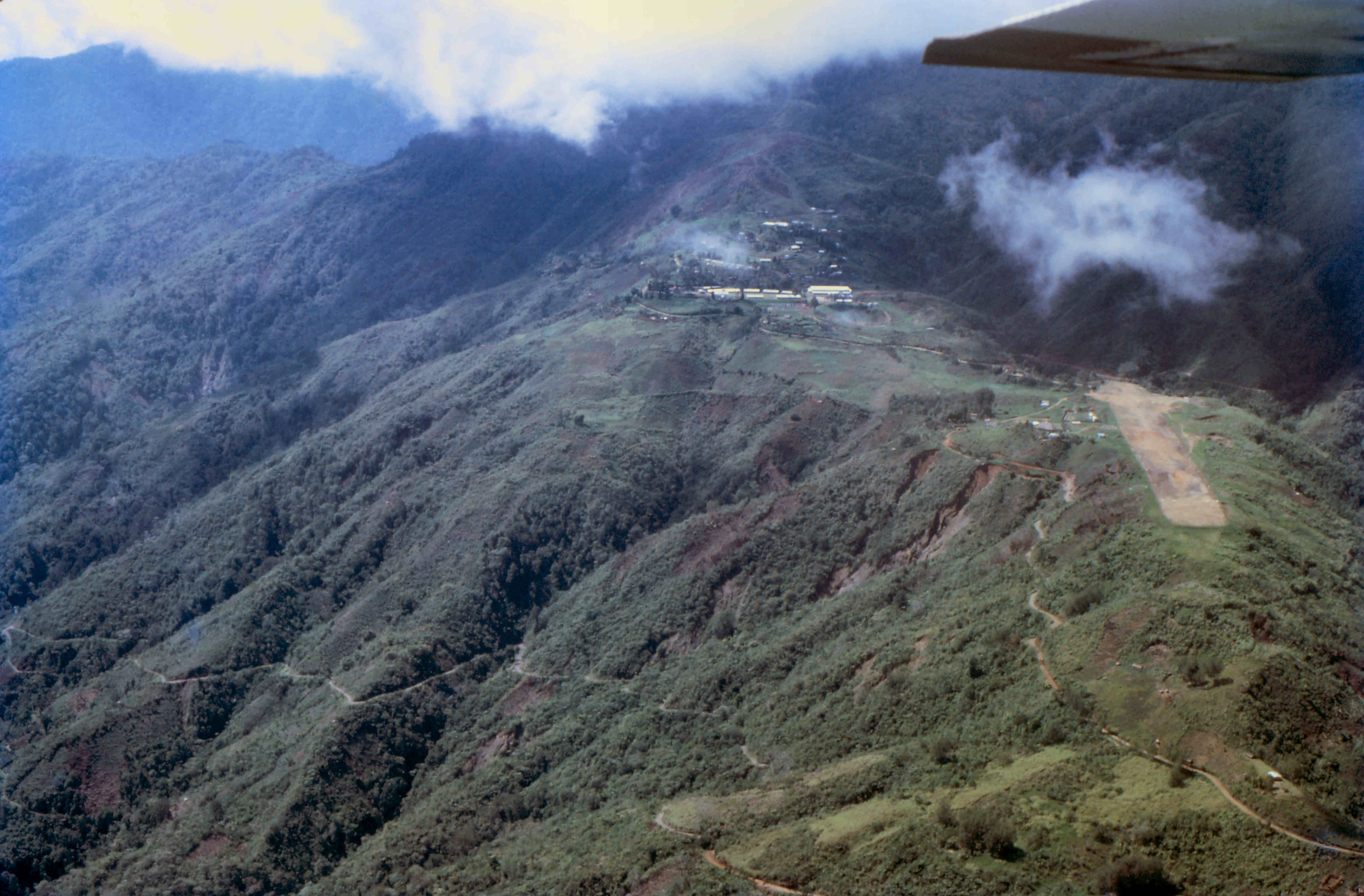
- Kasanombe Base Camp

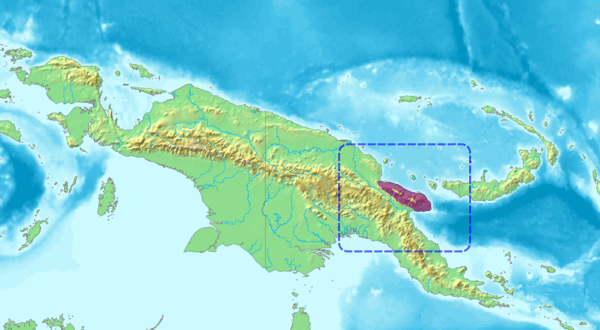
- Ecoregion territory (in purple)

Ecology
- Realm: Australasian realm
- Biome: tropical and subtropical moist broadleaf forests
- Borders: Central Range sub-alpine grasslands; Northern New Guinea lowland rain and freshwater swamp forests

Geography
- Area: 21,679 km^{2} (8,370 sq mi)
- Countries: Papua New Guinea
- Provinces: Madang Province; Morobe Province
- Coordinates: 6.4°S 147.5°E

Conservation
- Conservation status: Relatively stable/intact
- Protected: 3.5%

The Huon Peninsula montane rain forests is a tropical moist forest ecoregion in New Guinea. The ecoregion covers the mountains of northeastern New Guinea's Huon Peninsula.

== Geography ==
The ecoregion is made up of montane rain forests on the Huon Peninsula. The montane rain forests occur above 1000 meters elevation on the Peninsula's mountain ranges, which include the Finisterre (to 4,176 m), Saruwaged (to 4,122 m), and Cromwell and Rawlinson ranges.

== Climate ==
The ecoregion has a montane tropical rain forest climate.

== Flora ==
The ecoregion's forests are of several types, which vary with rainfall, elevation, and underlying soils. Lowland hill forests occupy the foothills of the range, forming a transition between the lowland alluvial forests below and the montane forests above. Montane rain forests grow between 1000 and 3000 meters elevation. Evergreen broadleaf trees are predominant, with conifers occurring above 2000 meters elevation and becoming more abundant at higher elevations. Species composition varies with elevation. There are also areas of limestone forest.

The epiphytic moss Merrilliobryum tanianum is endemic to the ecoregion.

== Fauna ==
The ecoregion has 81 species of mammals, including marsupials, murid rodents, and bats. There are Huon tree kangaroo (Dendrolagus matschiei) is endemic to the ecoregion. Several limited-range rodents, including the Highland brush mouse (Abeomelomys sevia) and Ernst Mayr's water rat (Leptomys ernstmayri), inhabit the ecoregion and neighboring highlands.

There are two endemic bird species, the Emperor bird-of-paradise (Paradisaea guilielmi) and Huon astrapia (Astrapia rothschildi). Together with the Adelbert Range to the west (which is part of the Northern New Guinea montane rain forests ecoregion), the ecoregion forms the Adelbert and Huon ranges endemic bird area.

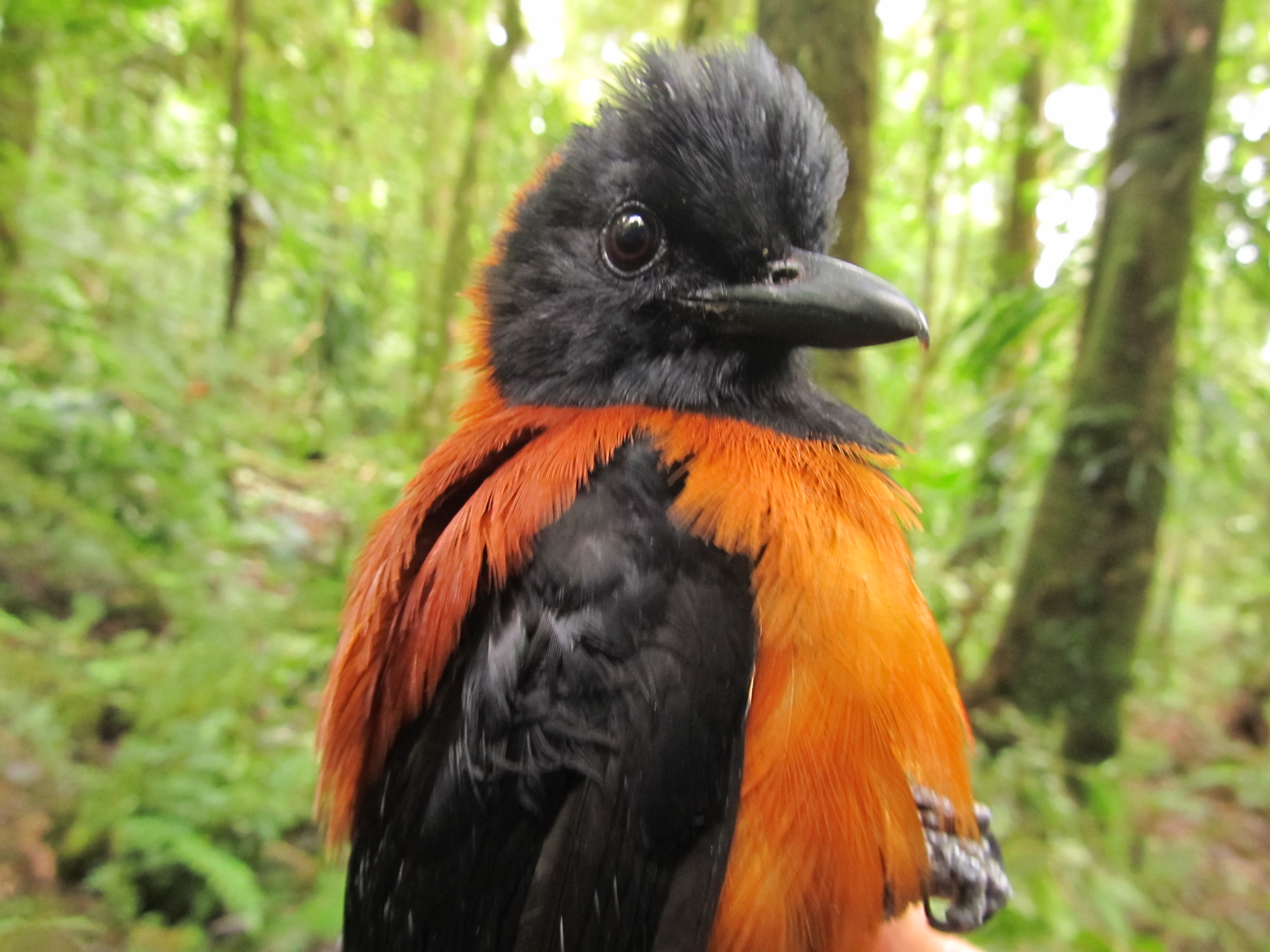
Hooded pitohui (Pitohui dichrous) in YUS Conservation Area

== Protected areas ==
3.7% of the ecoregion is in protected areas. Protected areas include Nusareng Wildlife Management Area (10.26 km^{2}) and YUS Conservation Area (793.11 km^{2}).
