= Bronze quoll =

Conservation status
- Near Threatened (IUCN 3.1)

Scientific classification
- Kingdom: Animalia
- Phylum: Chordata
- Class: Mammalia
- Infraclass: Marsupialia
- Order: Dasyuromorphia
- Family: Dasyuridae
- Genus: Dasyurus
- Species: D. spartacus

Binomial name
- Dasyurus spartacus Van Dyck, 1987
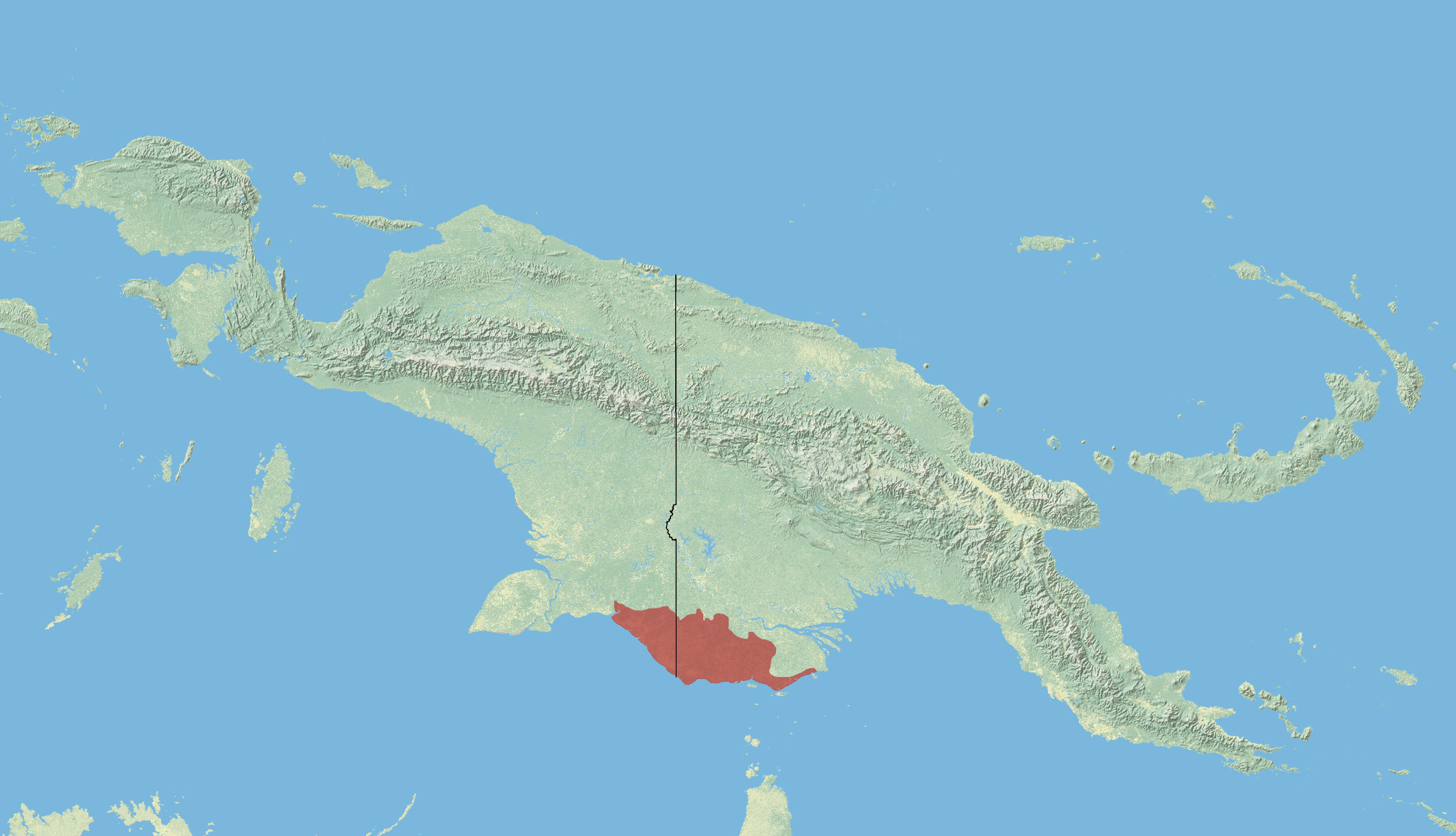
- Bronze quoll range

Species of marsupial

The bronze quoll (Dasyurus spartacus) is a species of quoll found only in the Trans-Fly savanna and grasslands of Papua New Guinea and South Papua in Indonesia.

== History ==
It was discovered in the early 1970s when five specimens were collected, but only described in 1987 when Dr. Stephen Van Dyck of the Queensland Museum examined them and recognised their distinctness. As of February 2013 there are twelve public museum specimens, 8 from traps and 4 from local hunters. It is the largest surviving marsupial carnivore of New Guinea, after the thylacine's extirpation from New Guinea thousands of years ago.

== Taxonomy ==
Very little is known of it; it was previously thought to be an outlying population of the western quoll (Dasyurus geoffroii).

== Status ==
As of February 2013, there was an estimated population of less than 10,000 and was listed as Near Threatened on the IUCN Red List. A nocturnal predator, it inhabits savanna woodlands. It is threatened by introduced predators like domesticated and feral dogs, and feral cats. It has been observed in Wasur National Park and Tonda Wildlife Management Area.
