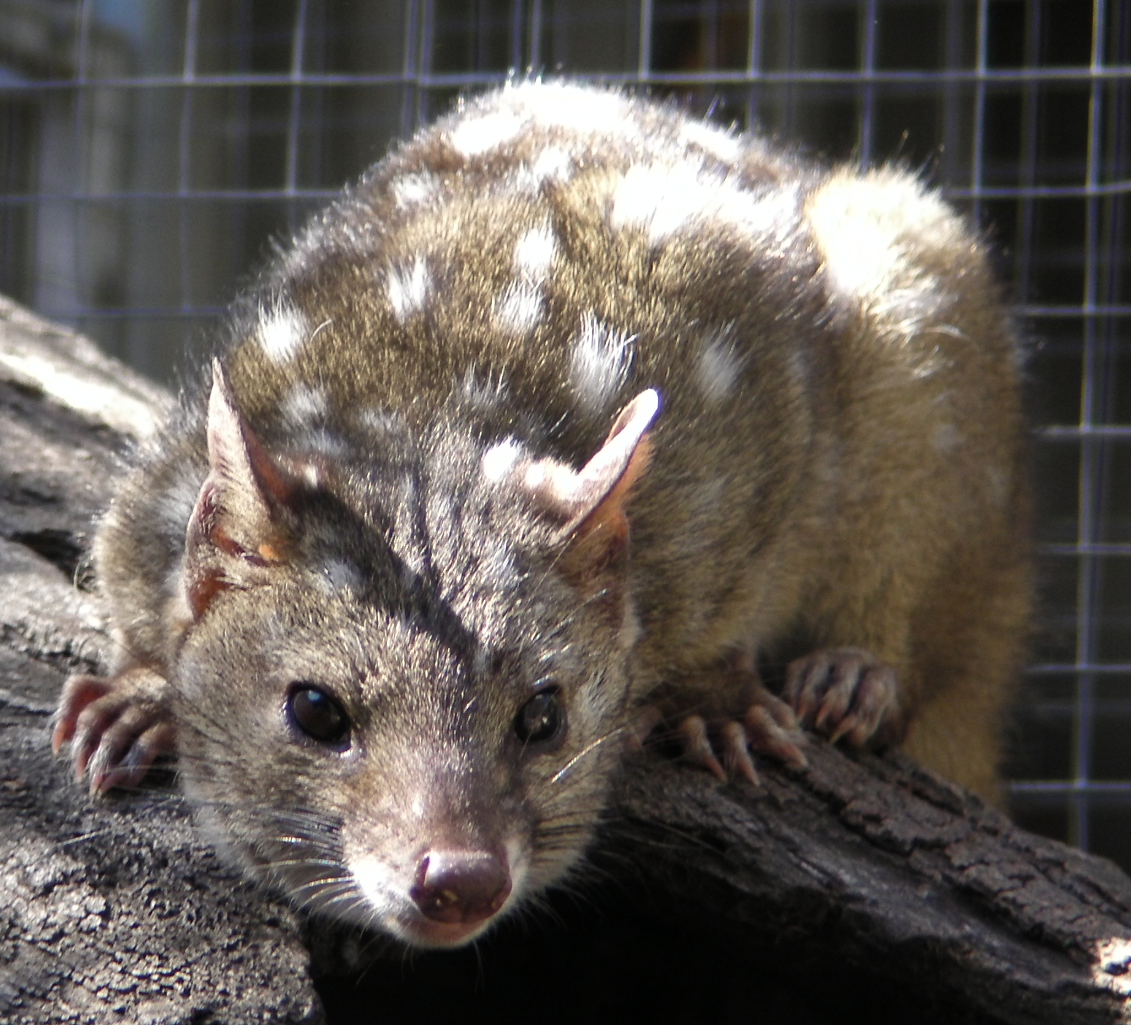
- A western quoll at Caversham Wildlife Park, Western Australia

Conservation status
- Near Threatened (IUCN 3.1)

- Vulnerable (EPBC Act)

Scientific classification
- Kingdom: Animalia
- Phylum: Chordata
- Class: Mammalia
- Infraclass: Marsupialia
- Order: Dasyuromorphia
- Family: Dasyuridae
- Genus: Dasyurus
- Species: D. geoffroii

Binomial name
- Dasyurus geoffroii Gould, 1841
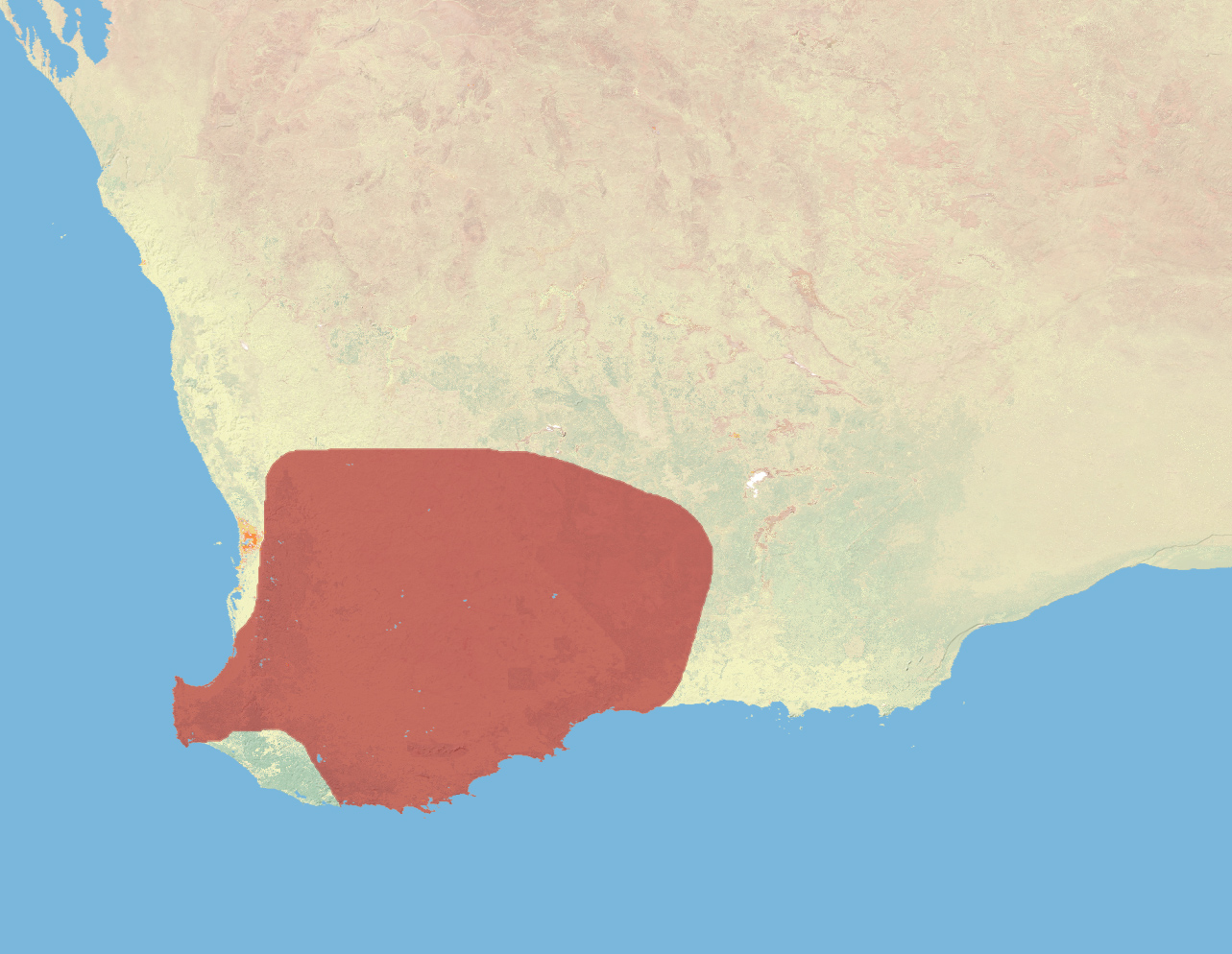
- Western quoll range

= Western quoll =

Species of marsupial

The western quoll (Dasyurus geoffroii) is Western Australia's largest endemic mammalian carnivore. One of the many marsupial mammals native to Australia, it is also known as the chuditch. The species is currently classed as near-threatened.

== Taxonomy ==
The western quoll is a member of the family Dasyuridae and is most closely related to the bronze quoll (Dasyurus spartacus), a recently described species from New Guinea that was for some time believed to be an outlying population of the western quoll. Its species name, geoffroii, refers to the prominent French naturalist Étienne Geoffroy Saint-Hilaire, who named the genus Dasyurus in 1796. The species has occasionally been placed in the genus Dasyurinus.

It is also known as the chuditch (/ˈtʃʊdɪtʃ/) in Western Australia (from Noongar djooditj); chuditch serves as both the singular and plural form. Other common names include atyelpe or chilpa (from Arrernte), kuninka (from Western Desert language); idnya (Adnyamathanha people of the Flinders Ranges) and the archaic western native cat.

== Description ==
The western quoll is about the size of a domestic cat. It is coloured a rufous brown and has 40–70 white spots on its back with a creamy white underside. Its spots help diminish its outline under moonlight at night when hunting. It has five toes on its hind feet and granular pads. The head and body are about 36 to 46 cm (14 to 18 in) in length, and the tail is around 22 to 30 cm (8.7 to 11.8 in). With large eyes and pointed ears, it is well adapted for nocturnal life. The black brush on its tail extends from halfway down to the tip. Males typically weigh around 1.3 kg (2.9 lb), and females 0.9 kg (2.0 lb). The longest they are likely to live is four years.

Often confused with eastern quoll, it differs in possessing a first toe on the hind foot and a darker tail. It does share a white-spotted brown coat and a long tail with both the eastern quoll and northern quoll.

== Habitat ==
Once found across 70% of the Australian continent, the western quoll is now confined to south-western corner of Western Australia. This perhaps was due to European settlement in the late 1780s as their range dramatically declined after this event. It currently inhabits wet and dry sclerophyll forests, including contiguous Jarrah Forest and mallee. These areas consist of open forest, low open forest, woodland, and open shrub. On occasion they are recorded in the WA Wheatbelt and Goldfields regions, and by the 1930s disappeared completely from Swan Coastal Plain and surrounds.

As a result of its carnivorous feeding habits, the western quoll has a large home range. These territories often share rock ledges and other open spaces. This serves to mark territory and for other social functions. Males spread out over about 15 square kilometres (5.8 sq mi) and typically overlap with several female ranges, about 3–4 square kilometres (1.2–1.5 sq mi) each. Although males share their large territories with smaller female territories, females do not cross theirs with other females. Most female home ranges contains around 70 hollow log dens and 110 burrows.

== Behaviour ==
A solitary, mostly terrestrial nocturnal predator, the western quoll is most active around dusk (crepuscular) when it hunts. It moves swiftly on the ground, climbs efficiently, and may dig or occupy existing burrows. During the day it seeks refuge in hollow logs or earth burrows as dens, and saves energy by lowering its body temperature in its sleep.

The western quoll is at the top of the food chain, and depends on resource abundance and a healthy ecosystem. Being a carnivore, the western quoll feeds on large invertebrates and any small animal it can. This includes lizards, birds, frogs, spiders, insects, and small mammals; the largest it will eat is the size of a bandicoot or parrot.

Reintroduced populations in South Australia have been recorded preying on rabbits and burrowing bettongs.

They hunt mostly on the ground, but will climb a tree to grab a bird's egg. A bite to the back of the head kills their larger prey. It possesses an ability to obtain most of its water from its food, which is especially handy for survival during a drought.

As seasonal breeders, western quolls mate between late April to July, and have a peak in June. During this time, the western quoll tends to take up large areas of habitat, and females aggressively defend their territory of 55–120 ha. Male and female quolls meet up only to mate. Although there are occasional cases when more young are produced than can be nursed, most litters range from two to six. There is a gestational period of 16 to 23 days which is followed by the young living in their mother's shallow pouch. After another seven to fifteen weeks, the young outgrow the pouch and are left in the den while the female forages for food. Weaned at 23 to 24 weeks, western quoll are independent at 18 weeks and are sexually mature at one year of age. The young disperse in November before taking up their own territories.

== Cultural significance ==
The western quoll is known as tjilpa amongst the Arrernte language group of Australian Aboriginal people. There are many Dreamtime stories of tribes of ancestral Tjilpa-men, who had a significant mythological role. The geographical range of these stories includes Aranda, Anmatyerre, Kaytetye, Ngalia, Ilpara and Kukatja lands.

== Decline ==
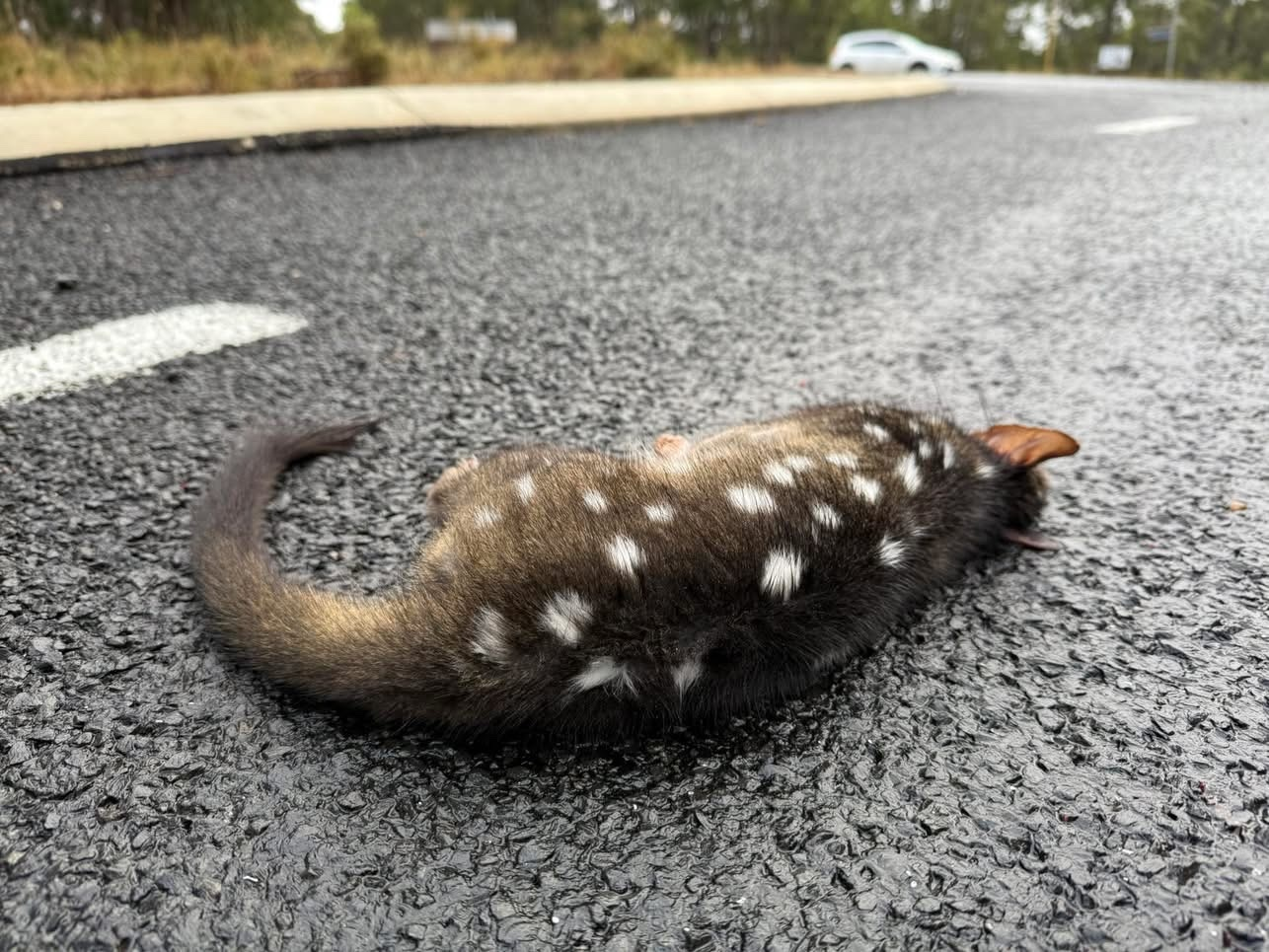
Western quoll roadkill

The western quoll has declined due to several factors. Land clearing, inappropriate fire regimes, grazing by stock and feral herbivores, illegal shooting, accidental drowning in water tanks, being hit by motor vehicles, and poisoning are all responsible for their disappearances. Foxes and cats have a massive impact; both predation and competition narrow room for the western quoll. As more land became less suitable for living in, the western quoll is forced to move elsewhere.

AWC (Australia Wildlife Conservancy) protects this species at Paruna Sanctuary using a comprehensive feral predator control program, which sees feral cat and fox numbers controlled using trapping and baiting.

== Reintroductions ==
There have been ongoing attempts to re-establish the western quoll in parts of its former range.

A five-year trial re-introduction of western quoll to the Flinders Ranges in South Australia began in April 2014. Despite the loss of about a third of the first release population (mostly due to predation by feral cats), most of the surviving females bred and sixty joeys were born. As of May 2016, a final release of 15 quolls from Western Australia was carried out in the Flinders Ranges, with a total population of 150. About half of this population was born locally. Monitoring of the population continued for an additional two years. The success of the reintroduction led to relocation of animals from the initial site in the Ikara–Flinders Ranges National Park to the Vulkathunha-Gammon Ranges National Park in 2022 and 2023.

The species has been returned to the South Australian arid zone, with a population established at the fenced Arid Recovery Reserve near Roxby Downs. Animals were reintroduced to the semi-arid Mount Gibson Sanctuary in WA in April 2023, with the aid of feral predator control.

Plans are in process to reintroduce the species to Dirk Hartog Island in Shark Bay, Wardang Island as part of the Marna Banggara (formerly Great Southern Ark) project on the southern Yorke Peninsula in South Australia, and large fenced reserves in the Pilliga Forest, Mallee Cliffs National Park and Sturt National Park, all in NSW.

Captive breeding programs have contributed to reintroduction efforts, with Perth Zoo providing some animals for release.
