= Merrilliobryum =

Scientific classification
- Kingdom: Plantae
- Division: Bryophyta
- Class: Bryopsida
- Subclass: Bryidae
- Order: Hypnales
- Family: Myriniaceae
- Genus: Merrilliobryum; Broth.

Genus of mosses

Merrilliobryum is a genus of mosses in family Myriniaceae. Species of the genus are found in New Guinea and the Philippines.

The genus name of Merrilliobryum is in honour of Elmer Drew Merrill (1876-1956), who was an American botanist and taxonomist. The genus was circumscribed by Viktor Ferdinand Brotherus in 1908.

== Species ==
The following two species are recognised in the genus Merrilliobryum:

- Merrilliobryum fabronioides Broth.
- Merrilliobryum tanianum D.H.Norris, T.J.Kop. & W.R.Buck
