= Merrilliobryum fabronioides =

Conservation status
- Endangered (IUCN 2.3)

Scientific classification
- Kingdom: Plantae
- Division: Bryophyta
- Class: Bryopsida
- Subclass: Bryidae
- Order: Hypnales
- Family: Myriniaceae
- Genus: Merrilliobryum
- Species: M. fabronioides

Binomial name
- Merrilliobryum fabronioides Broth.

Species of moss

Merrilliobryum fabronioides is a species of mosses in the family Myriniaceae. It is endemic to the Philippines, where it is known from a few locations in the mountains of northern Luzon. It is an endangered species found in habitat that is degraded by agriculture, logging, and mining.
