= Merrilliobryum tanianum =

Scientific classification
- Kingdom: Plantae
- Division: Bryophyta
- Class: Bryopsida
- Subclass: Bryidae
- Order: Hypnales
- Family: Myriniaceae
- Genus: Merrilliobryum
- Species: M. tanianum

Binomial name
- Merrilliobryum tanianum D.H. Norris, T.J. Kop. & W.R. Buck (2008)

Species of moss

Merrilliobryum tanianum is a species of moss in the family Myriniaceae. It is endemic to the Huon Peninsula of New Guinea.

== Description ==
The plants are small, and pale green with yellow to pale green stems. Plants are irregularly branched with prostrate stems and branches erect to decumbent. The branches are densely covered in small leaves, homomallous, constricted at their bases and easily detached.

== Habitat and ecology ==
M. tanianum grows in shady habitats and is mostly epiphytic, commonly found on tree trunks and bark, trunks of tree ferns and Pandanus, and on cliffs.

The species is found in montane rain forest on the Huon Peninsula in northeastern New Guinea, 1100 to 2900 meters. Specimens have been collected in a range of habitats, including undisturbed very wet montane rain forest, second-growth and badly-disturbed rain forests, disturbed groves of Pandanus, open rainforests on ridge crests, and in rain forest patches surrounded by open Miscanthus grassland.

== Taxonomy ==
The plant is named for Dr. Benito C. Tan, a bryologist and expert in tropical mosses.
