= Cromwell Mountains =

Mountain range in Papua New Guinea

- Location within Papua New Guinea

Geography
- Location: Papua New Guinea
- Range coordinates: 06°13′S 147°22′E

The Cromwell Mountains is a mountain range on the Huon Peninsula in north-eastern Papua New Guinea.

The range is part of the Huon Peninsula montane rain forests. The character and species composition of the forests varies with elevation. Species of Castanopsis and Lithocarpus are the predominant trees in the lower montane forests, which extend from approximately 1000 to 2,000 meters elevation. Above 2,000 meters species of Xanthomyrtus, Vaccinium, and Rhododendron are common, transitioning to Lithocarpus–Elmerrillia forests at approximately 2,300 m. Above 2,400 meters, forests are dominated by broadleaved Elaeocarpus and the conifers Phyllocladus, Podocarpus, and Dacrydium. The mountains are home to the most extensive unlogged Dacrydium forests in the Southern Hemisphere.

== Climate ==
The climate in the region is typical of tropical rainforests, with high temperatures, humidity, and rainfall all year round. The temperatures in the Cromwell Mountains hover around 25°C (77°F) throughout the year, except for higher elevations where it can get cooler. The humidity level is around 80% on average. Rainfall is abundant in the Cromwell Mountains, with around 4,000 millimeters (157 inches) of rainfall each year. It's spread out relatively evenly, so there's no distinct dry season. The wet season is from November to April, with heavier rainfall and thunderstorms during this time. The climate is influenced by the region's location in the tropics and proximity to the equator. The Southeast Trade Winds bring moist air from the Pacific Ocean, leading to high levels of precipitation. The mountainous terrain also contributes to local variations in weather patterns.
