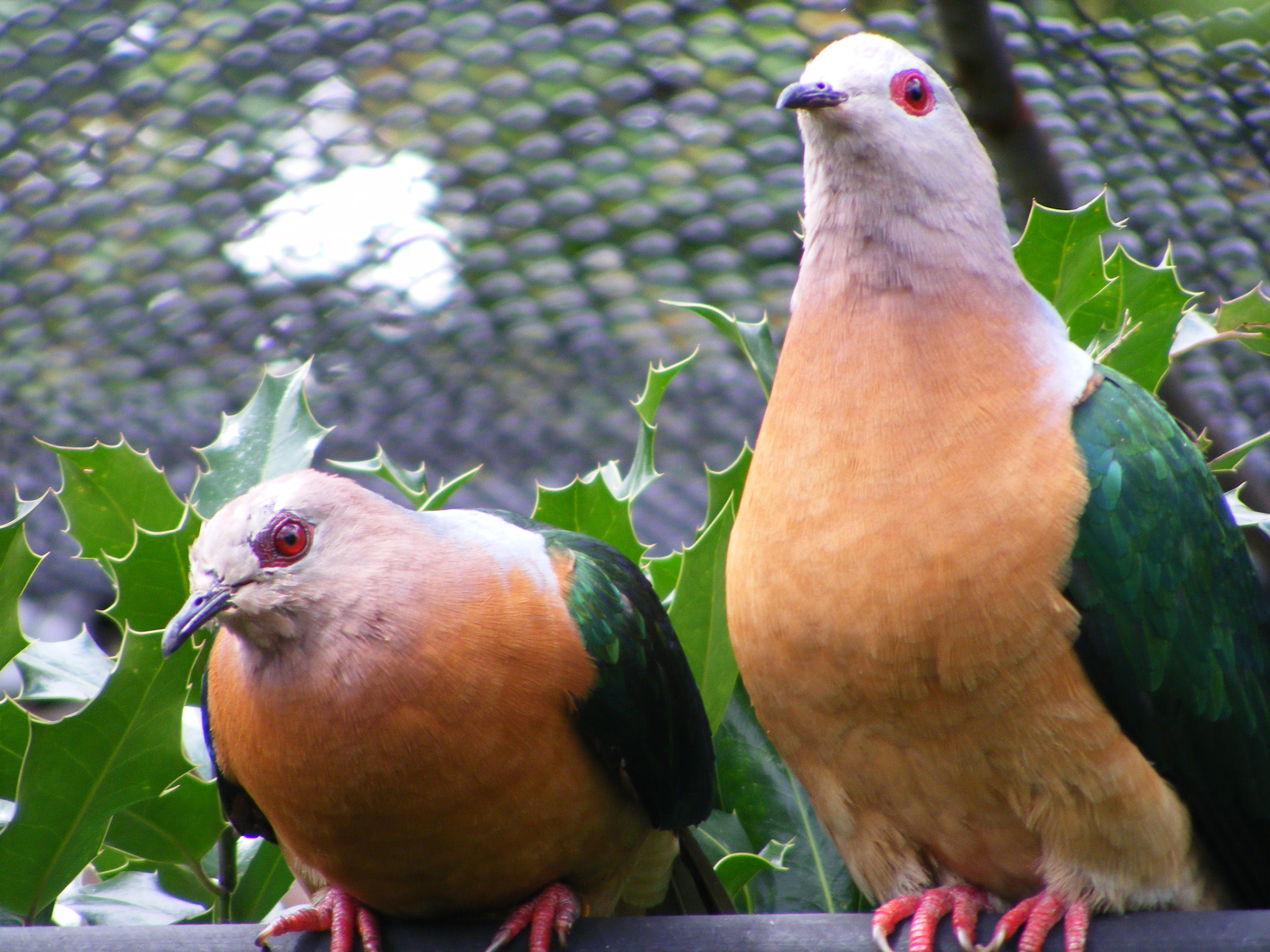

Conservation status
- Least Concern (IUCN 3.1)

Scientific classification
- Kingdom: Animalia
- Phylum: Chordata
- Class: Aves
- Order: Columbiformes
- Family: Columbidae
- Genus: Ducula
- Species: D. rufigaster

Binomial name
- Ducula rufigaster (Quoy & Gaimard, 1832)

= Purple-tailed imperial pigeon =

Species of bird

The purple-tailed imperial pigeon (Ducula rufigaster) is a species of bird in the family Columbidae. It is found in New Guinea. Its natural habitat is subtropical or tropical moist lowland forests.

== Taxonomy ==
Purple-tailed imperial pigeon as depicted by Jean-Gabriel Prêtre in Voyage de la corvette l'Astrolabe.

The purple-tailed imperial pigeon was first described by Quoy and Gaimard in 1832 as Columba rufigaster.

Two subspecies are recognized:

- D. r. rufigaster (Quoy and Gaimard, 1832): Nominate subspecies. Found from the Raja Ampat archipelago and Bird's Head Peninsula, eastwards through southern New Guinea, to Orangerie Bay.
- D. r. uropygialis (Stresemann and Paludan, 1932): Northern New Guinea, eastwards to Huon Gulf, as well as Yapen Island. Differs from nominate by more uniformly green upperparts, as well as more pale orange rump and underparts.

The type locality of the nominate subspecies, D. r. rufigaster, is Manokwari, known at the time as Dorey. The type specimen of the subspecies D. r. uropygialis is Ramu, New Guinea.

== Etymology ==
The genus name Ducula is derived from the Nepalese word dukul, which refers to imperial pigeons.

The specific epithet rufigaster comes from Latin rufus, meaning red, and gaster, meaning belly. The subspecific epithet of the subspecies D. r. uropygialis comes from Medieval Latin uropygium, meaning rump.

== Description ==
Purple-tailed imperial pigeon at Port Moresby Nature Park.

The purple-tailed imperial pigeon is a large pigeon, with a pale pink head, orange to pale orange underparts, emerald green wings and back, and a namesake purple rump. The pigeon's upper mantle and nape are blue-grey, and it has a distinctive grey band at the end of the tail.

== Distribution and habitat ==
The purple-tailed imperial pigeon is endemic to New Guinea, and is found throughout most of the island with the exception of the highlands. It is also found on the offshore island of Yapen, and in the Raja Ampat archipelago.

The pigeon is primarily found in lowland and foothill forest and forest edge up to 600 metres, though in some areas it can be found up to 1200 metres.

== Ecology ==
Purple-tailed imperial pigeon in Kairuku-Hiri District, Papua New Guinea.

The purple-tailed imperial pigeon is frugivorous. Plants of importance in its diet include palms (Arecaceae), laurels (Lauraceae), figs (Moraceae), nutmegs (Myristicaceae), and Combretaceae. The most common fruits recorded in one study were of the genera Cinnamomum, Litsea, and Neolitsea.

This species prefers to fly at or below canopy level. It is reportedly extremely wary.

The purple-tailed imperial pigeon is sometimes parasitized by the mite Gunabopicobia masalaje, a species described in 2014.

== Status ==
The purple-tailed imperial pigeon is listed as Least Concern by the IUCN. Its population is suspected to be decreasing.
