= Conservation in Papua New Guinea =

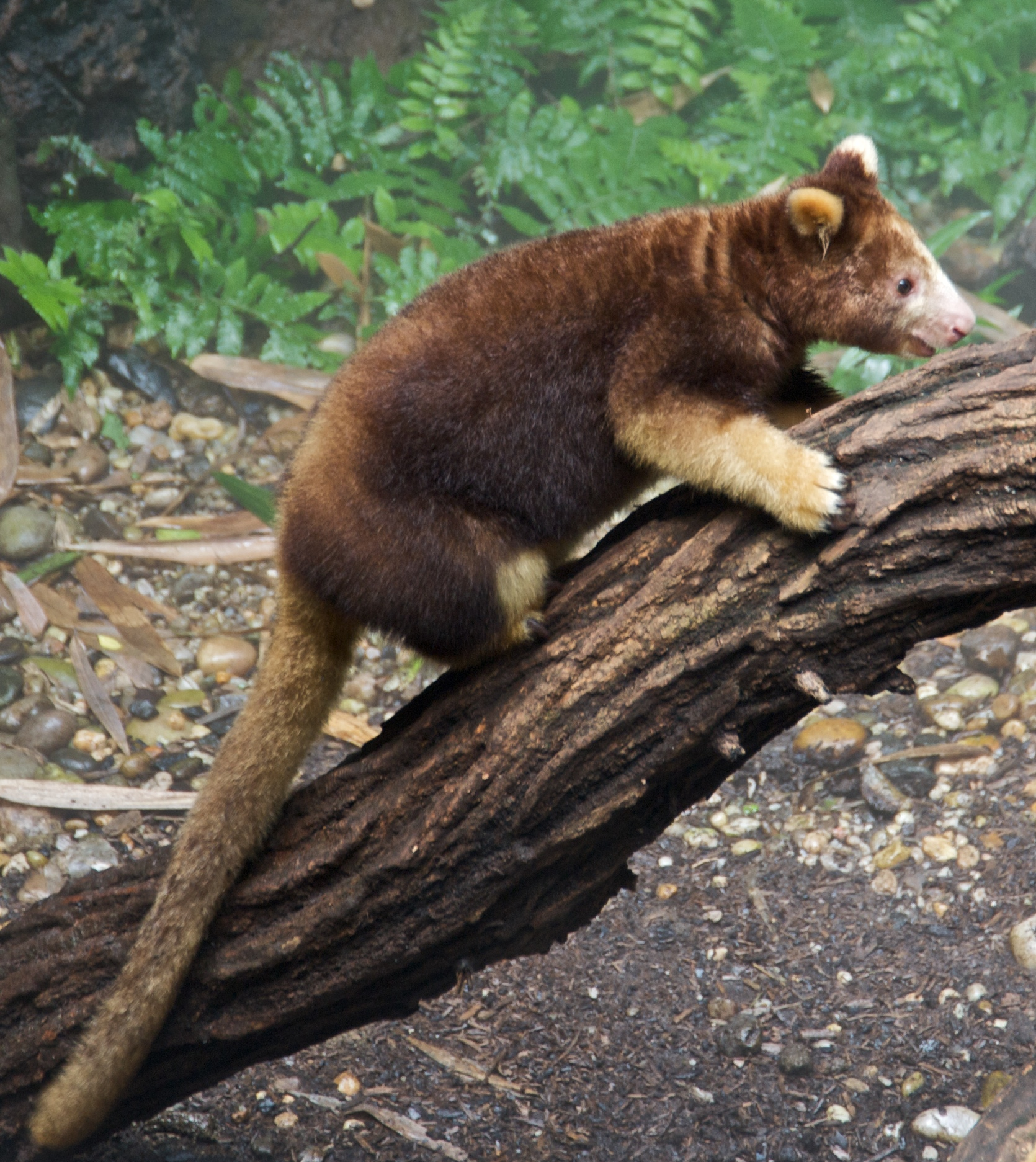
Matschie's tree-kangaroo, an endangered endemic species found in Huon Peninsula.

Papua New Guinea together with the West Papua region of Indonesia (New Guinea) makes up a major tropical wilderness area that still contains 5% of the original and untouched tropical high-biodiversity terrestrial ecosystems. PNG in itself contains over 5% of the world's biodiversity in less than 1% of the world's total land area. The flora of New Guinea is unique because it has two sources of origin; the Gondwana flora from the south and flora with Asian origin from the west.

As a result, New Guinea shares major families and genera with Australia and East Asia, but is rich in local endemic species. Endemism is a result of mountainous isolation, topographic and soil habitat heterogeneity, high forest disturbance rates and abundant aseasonal rainfall year round. PNG boasts some 15–21,000 higher plants, 3,000 species of orchids, 800 species of coral, 600 species of fish, 250 species of mammals and 760 species of birds and 8 species of tree-kangaroos of which 84 genera of animals are endemic. Ecosystems range from lowland forests to montane forests, alpine flora down to coastal areas which contain some of the most extensive pristine mangrove areas in the world.

Much of this biodiversity has remained intact for thousands of years because the ruggedness of the terrain made the interior lands inaccessible; furthermore low population density and restrictions on the effectiveness of traditional tools, ensured that this biodiversity was never overexploited.

== Biodiversity value ==
Even though this biodiversity is on just 1% of the world land mass, it has both global and local value. Most of the ecosystem services provided by the forests and oceans (e.g. water cycling, carbon cycling) is impartial to political boundaries. New Guinea was identified as the world's most floristically diverse island, with 13,634 known species of vascular plants.

Within the country, about 79% of the PNG population depend on the biological resources to sustain their physical, spiritual and social livelihoods. The biological resources are a source of food, building material, medicine for minor ailments, and logs for canoes. The traditional society revered, and respected nature because it was considered a gift from some ancestor". Currently, the harvesting of natural resource for export is a source of income that sustains the modern PNG economy.

== Legal framework ==
=== Constitution ===
The PNG government recognized the relationship between the people and nature and at independence, provision was made in the constitution for "all necessary steps to be taken to give adequate protection to all our valued birds, animals, fish, insects, plants and trees".

=== Legislation ===
Currently, biodiversity is explicitly protected by the following legislation: the Fauna Act/1982, the Conservation Areas Act/1980, 1992, the Crocodile Trade Act/1982, and the International Trade Act/1982.

Legislation relevant to marine biodiversity includes the Fauna (Protection and Control) Act (1982), the Fisheries (Torres Strait Protected Zone) Act (1978), the Dumping of Wastes at Sea Act (1981), the Environmental Contaminants Act (1978), the Fisheries Management Act (1998), the Whaling Act (1974) and the Prevention of Pollution of the Sea Act (1981).

In February 2024 a Protected Areas Act became law. This sought to meet 30 by 30 target of protecting 30% of the country by 2030. With over 90% of Papua New Guinea being customary land, the bill allows for customary landowners to apply to have some of their land become a protected area, following which they will receive livelihood support for sustainable practices from the government.

=== International environmental law ===
PNG is also a party to international environmental protection conventions and treaties. These international treaties include the International Plant Protection Convention (1951); the Convention on the Prevention of Marine Pollution by Dumping of Wastes and other matter (1972); the Convention on the International Trade in Endangered Species of Wild Flora and Fauna (CITES); the Ramsar Convention on Wetlands of International Importance (1992); the Convention on Biological Diversity (1992) and the Convention on the Conservation of Migratory Species of Wild Animals. PNG is also in partnership with other nations in the Oceania region and is a signatory to several regional conventions including, the Convention on Conservation of Nature in the South Pacific (APIA Convention) and the Waigani Convention (Convention to Ban the importation into Forum Island Countries of Hazardous and Radioactive Wastes and to Control the Transboundary Movement of Hazardous wastes within the South Pacific Region).

=== Institutions and organisations ===
The Conservation and Environment Protection Authority (CEPA) which was formerly Department of Environment and Conservation (DEC) until 2014 is the government agency responsible for biodiversity conservation. Its objectives, powers and authority are set out in the establishing Act, the Conservation and Environment Protection Authority Act 2014. The act is expressed to bind the State of PNG (s.3).

The PNG government's efforts to conserve biodiversity are supported by international environmental conservation Non-governmental organizations (NGOs). The major government research organizations include the Forestry Research Institute (FRI), and the National Agriculture Research Institute (NARI). The government owned universities: the University of Papua New Guinea (UPNG) and the University of Technology (UNITECH) also contribute to novel researches into the PNG biodiversity. The government research organizations tend to place emphasis on species with economical value to PNG. The NGOs, on the other hand are the driving force for biodiversity conservation for the sake of conservation. The major international NGO's assisting in biodiversity conservation include: Conservation International (CI), Wildlife Conservation Society (WCS), World Wildlife Fund (WWF) and The Nature Conservancy (TNC). Some indigenous PNG NGO's remain active, including The New Guinea Binatang Research Centre (BRC) (with multiple conservation partners across Madang including Wanang Conservation Area, Mt Wilhelm Conservation Area, Kau Wildlife Management Area, Ohu Conservation Area, among others), Partners with Melanesians (PwM), (notably in Managalas in Oro Province and Karimui), Research and Conservation Foundation of PNG (RCF) (operating primarily in Crater Mountain WMA and on environmental education), Tenkile Conservation Alliance(in Sandaun Province), and PNG Institute of Biological Research, but others that had active conservation programmes (Conservation Melanesia, Melanesian Environment Foundation, Village Development Trust, Pacific Heritage Foundation), have largely faded from the scene, leaving conservation today mostly to the PNG offices of the large international conservation organisations; blame for the demise of the homegrown organisations has, in at least one instance, been placed partly on the afore-mentioned international conservation organisations.

== Status of Biodiversity Protection ==
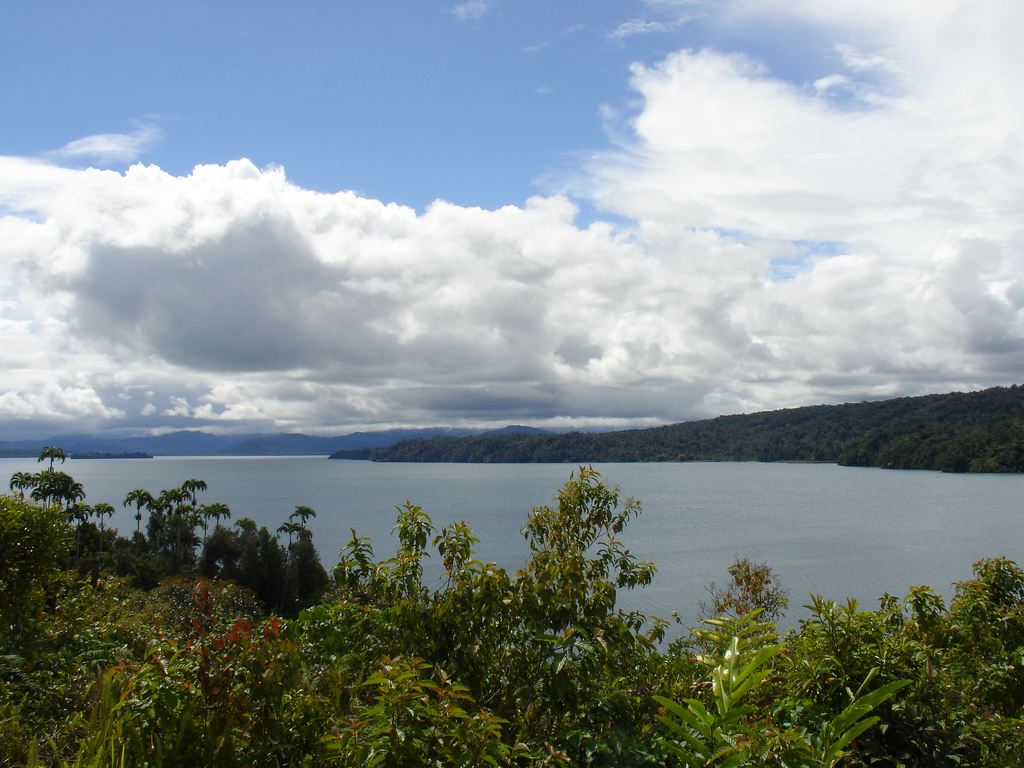
Lake Kutubu WMA, a wetland of international importance with 12 endemic fish species.

The history of conservation efforts in PNG dates back to the mid-1800s. Since gaining independence in 1975, the PNG government's efforts to protect biodiversity have resulted in the establishment of 44 terrestrial protected areas under the International Union for Conservation of Nature (IUCN) categories. These protected areas account for 1.6% of the total land area. A study of biodiversity identified 398 additional areas as conservation candidates, potentially increasing the protected areas to 16.8% of the country's total area.

Included in the PNG protected area list, but not formally recognized by IUCN is the terrestrial Wildlife Management Area (WMA). WMA is an Integrated Conservation and Development Project (ICAD), which seeks to conserve biological diversity by involving landowners. The idea behind the project is that income generating activities, from the biological diversity would encourage people living in these areas to conserve, because such projects would link the value of these resources to living standard and also access to markets. The progress of WMA's is yet to be evaluated.

Papua New Guinea's first conservation area, the YUS Conservation Area, was established in 2009 on the Huon Peninsula, Morobe Province.

Apart from local conservation efforts, PNG is also a signatory to international conventions and treaties. These international treaties include: the International Plant Protection Convention (1951); the Convention on the Prevention of Marine Pollution by Dumping Wastes and Other Matter (1972); the Convention on International Trade in Endangered Species of Wild Fauna and Flora (CITES); the Ramsar Convention on Wetlands of International Importance (1992); the Convention on Biological Diversity (1992) and the Convention on the Conservation of Migratory Species of Wild Animals. PNG is also in partnership with other nations in the Oceania region and is a signatory to the regional convention, The Convention on Conservation of Nature in the South Pacific (APIA Convention).

PNG has two listed Ramsar sites: Lake Kutubu and Tonda Wildlife Management Area.

== Challenges to the conservation efforts ==
Despite the provision for conservation in the legal framework, as well as interest shown by the international organizations, it is still a challenge to carry out conservation in PNG.

=== Land ownership issues ===
The land tenure, wherein the communities own 97% of the land makes it difficult for the government or any conservation organisation to procure land for conservation. The land is believed to be an inheritance from some mystical ancestor and therefore, cannot be sold to foreigners. Therefore, involving communities in Wildlife Management Areas (WMA) was identified as being compatible with the PNG land tenure system. The PNG constitution recognised this and empowered the landowners to be involved with conservation on their own land. However, the progress of WMA's is yet to be evaluated. The national government can acquire land and land leaseholds are gaining acceptance in PNG.

=== Economic drivers ===
PNG raises most of its revenue from the extraction of natural resources; as such environmental destructive developmental projects have always taken precedence over environmental protection.

=== Forestry ===
The logging industry in PNG has been identified as the main source of widespread overexploitation of forest as well as species dependent on the forests. About 23% of the 50,000-60,000 ha cleared permanently is done by industrial logging. Forests that evolved over millions of years are being deforested at an average rate of 1% per year. The reluctance of government support for conservation can be seen in government documents containing recommendations which are very general with no defined goal for the future of conservation. Papua New Guinea had a 2018 Forest Landscape Integrity Index mean score of 8.84/10, ranking it 17th globally out of 172 countries.

=== Population growth rate ===
The increase in human population (3.2% children per child bearing female) has increased the per capita consumption of the biological resources. For instance, the pressure to hunt big game for food has increased with the growth of population, this situation is exacerbated by the fact that when these animals become rarer, their value will resulting in added pressure to acquire them. The rate and efficiency of harvesting has also increased, aided by modern and efficient harvesting implements.

Furthermore, is the misconception by the populace that natural resource is infinite. For instance, some coastal communities practice "dynamite fishing", without knowing that this practice not only kills fish and other marine organisms indiscriminately, it also destroys the coral reefs. Most coastal communities have little understanding how fish stocks are recruited and maintained in the oceans. On the side of forests,

=== Criticism of international NGOs ===
There has been strong debate about whether conservation driven by international NGOs is truly sustainable in PNG; certain large integrated conservation-development projects operated by the local offices of these international NGOs has come under fire, and broader complaints have surfaced. The criticism is that international conservation NGOs have become corporate entities in a way that no longer mirrors the way indigenous conservation initiative has naturally evolved in countries prior to their existence.

=== Climate change ===
The effects of climate change and the introduction of exotic species add another dimension onto the challenge of conservation. The potential impacts from climate change (changes in geographical range, morphology, physiology and phenology) on terrestrial species are shown to be happening elsewhere; however no formal studies have been conducted on PNG terrestrial species as yet. However, the effects of climate change are definitely showing on the coastlines. Rise in sea level is starting to displace people in low-lying islands. Furthermore, coral bleaching, an effect of high temperatures and increased carbon dioxide in oceans was observed from the PNG waters in 1996.

=== Invasive species ===
In the case of the introduced species, since the 1950s, 26 species of fresh water fish were introduced into PNG, out of which 11 species are now established in the fresh water systems and competes for resources with the 214 native fresh water species. The Mozambique tilapia (Oreochromomis mossambica) was introduced in 1954, as a protein supplement. Currently, the tilapia is very widespread and important as food for some communities. However, it has a negative effect on indigenous fauna in lakes and rivers because of its prolific breeding and bottom feeding habit. Furthermore, studies have shown that the over the years that there has been a decrease in the native fish catch and an increase in the introduced tilapia.

== See also ==
- List of international environmental agreements
- List of protected areas of Papua New Guinea
- List of World Heritage Sites in Oceania
- Mining in Papua New Guinea
  - Ok Tedi environmental disaster
