= Wasur National Park =

National park in Indonesia

- Taman Nasional Wasur
- IUCN category II (national park)
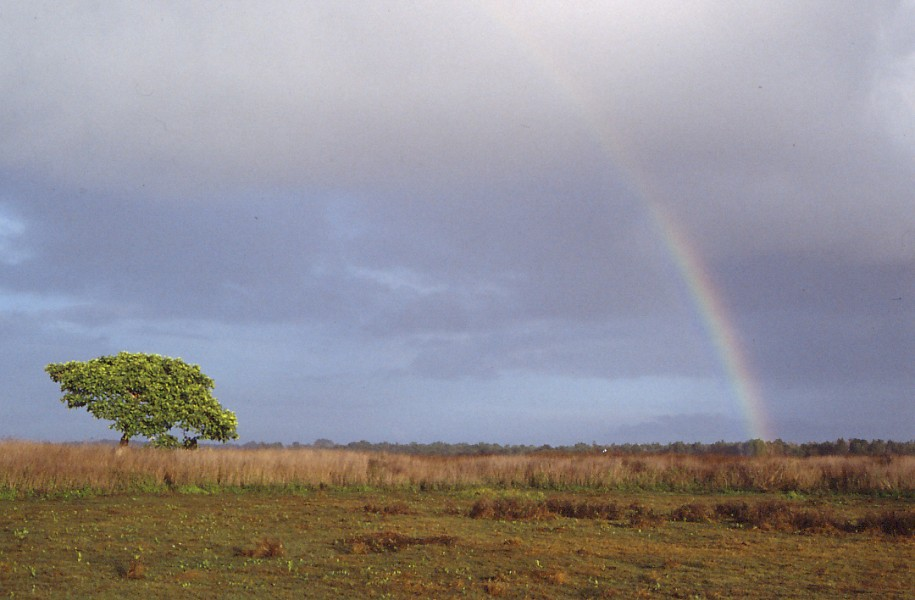

- Location within South Papua
- Location: South Papua, Indonesia
- Nearest city: Merauke
- Coordinates: 8°36′S 140°50′E
- Area: 4,138 km^{2} (1,598 sq mi)
- Established: 1990
- Visitors: 2,265 (in 2004)
- Governing body: Ministry of Environment and Forestry

Ramsar Wetland
- Designated: 16 March 2006
- Reference no.: 1624

The Wasur National Park forms part of the largest wetland in Merauke Regency, South Papua, Indonesia and has been one of the least disturbed by human activity. The high value of its biodiversity has led to the park being dubbed the "Serengeti of Papua". The vast open wetland, in particular Rawa Biru Lake, attracts a very rich fauna.

== Vegetation and fauna ==
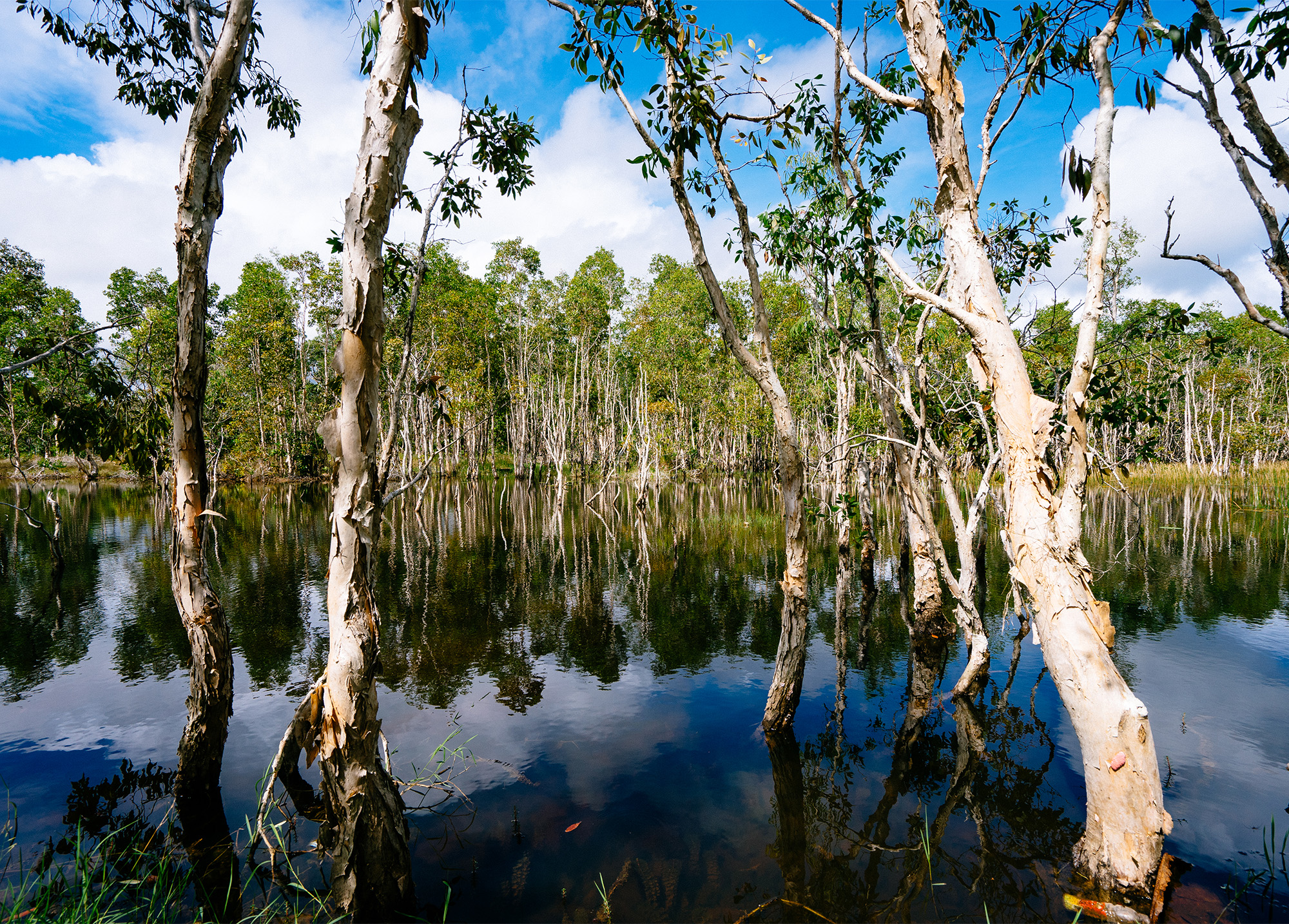
Melaleucas

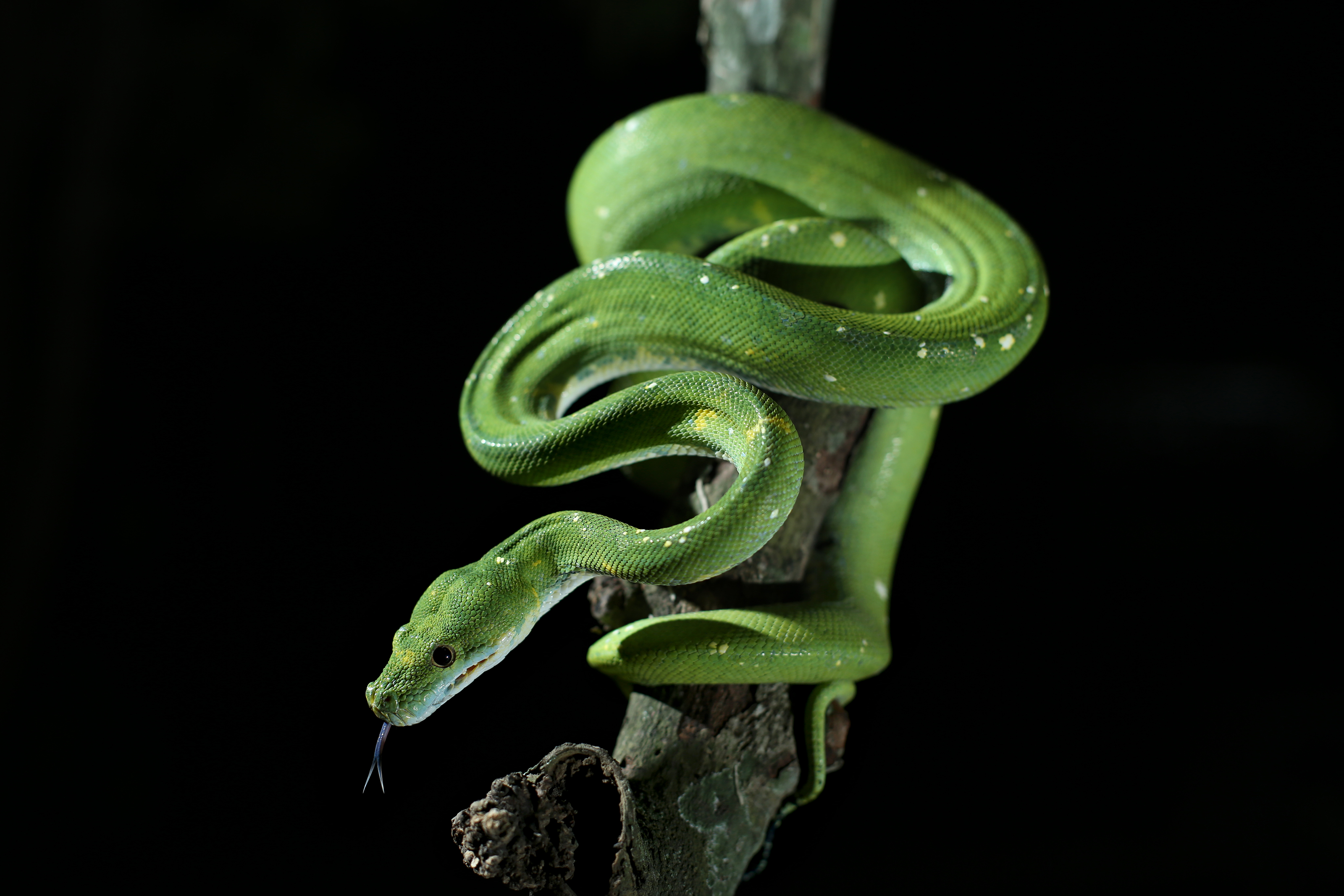
Morelia viridis in Wasur NP

About 70% of the total area of the park consists of savanna (see Trans-Fly savanna and grasslands), while the remaining vegetation is swamp forest, monsoon forest, coastal forest, bamboo forest, grassy plains and large stretches of sago swamp forest. The dominant plants include mangroves, Terminalia, and Melaleuca species.

The park provides habitat for a large variety of up to 358 bird species of which some 80 species are endemic to the island of New Guinea. Fish diversity is also high in the region with some 111 species found in the eco-region and a large number of these are recorded from Wasur. The park's wetland provides habitat for various species of lobster and crab as well.

Common fauna species include the agile wallaby, Pesquet's parrot, southern cassowary, blue crowned pigeon, greater bird-of-paradise, king bird-of-paradise, red bird-of-paradise, New Guinea crocodile, and saltwater crocodile.

Wasur National Park is the habitat for a number of rare and endemic species. Red Listed species known to be present in viable populations are southern crowned pigeon, New Guinea harpy eagle, dusky pademelon, black-necked stork, Fly River grassbird and little curlew. Three trans-Fly endemic bird species have been recorded, including the Fly River grassbird and the grey-crowned munia.

The introduction of the rusa deer to Papua by the Dutch at Merauke in 1928, led to an extensive spread of this species to most of the southern coastlands of the island. According to the indigenous communities of the national park, this led to major changes to the local ecosystem, including: the reduction of tall swamp grasses and consequent ceasing of breeding of the Australian pelican and magpie goose, reduction of the Phragmites reed species, and the extensive spread of Melaleuca onto the open grasslands.

== Conservation ==
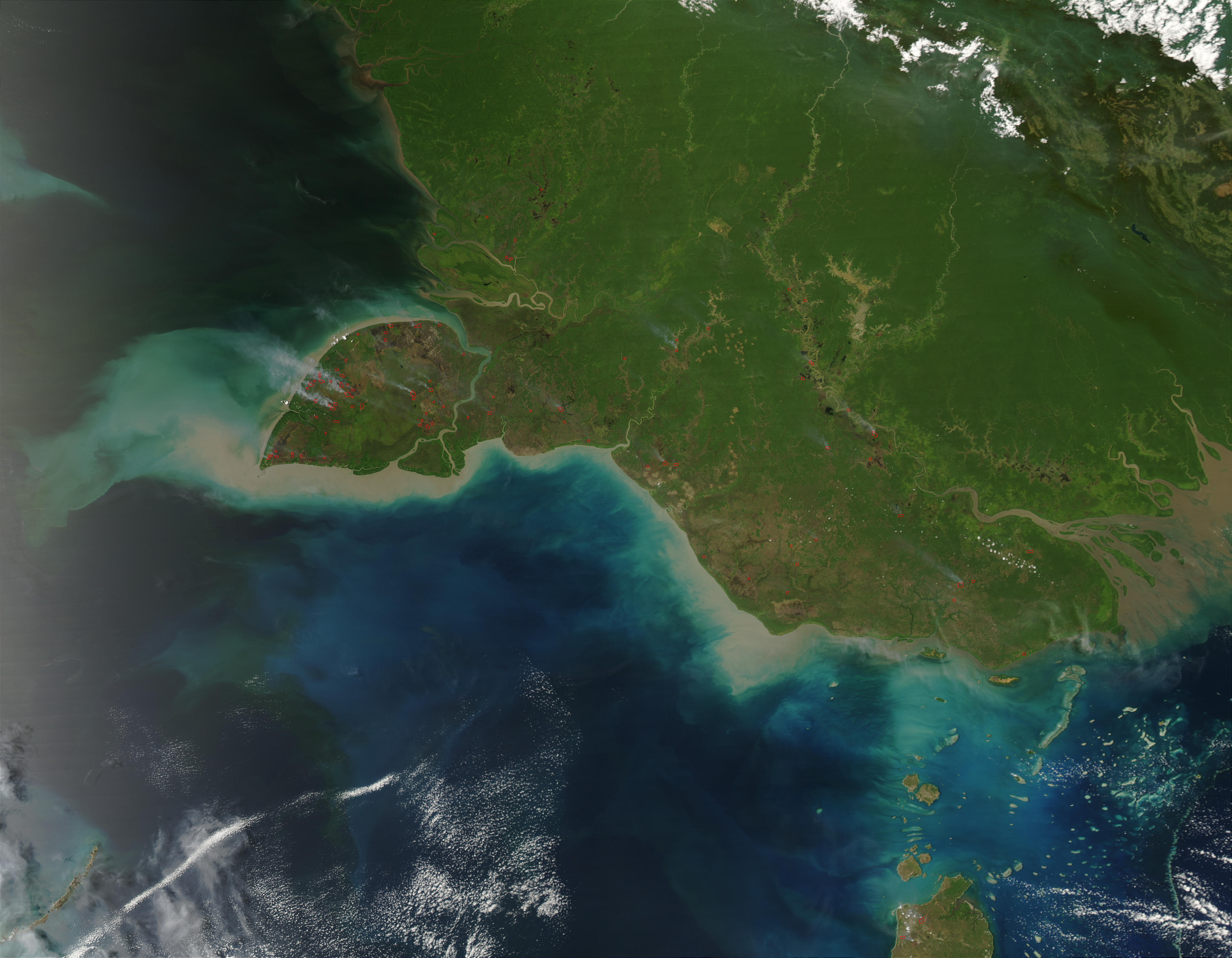
Satellite image of Southern New Guinea, Wasur NP and Tonda WMA are located between the Merauke and Fly Rivers. Wildfires of 2002 are marked in red.

The Wasur area was first designated as a wildlife reserve in 1978 with an area of 2,100 km^{2}. An extended area of 4,138 km^{2} was later declared a national park in 1990. In 2006 the park has been also recognised as a wetland of international importance under the Ramsar Convention. Wasur shares a common border with Tonda Wildlife Management Area (WMA), another Ramsar site in neighbouring Papua New Guinea. Wasur National Park has been the site of a World Wide Fund for Nature (WWF) conservation and development project since 1991. In 1995 a Tri-National Wetlands Program has been initiated by WWF between Wasur NP, Tonda WMA and the Australian Kakadu National Park, which led to a Memorandum of Understanding between the three government conservation agencies in 2002.

== Human habitation ==
There are four groups of indigenous peoples living in the park, belonging to the tribes of Kanum, Marind, Marori Men-Gey and Yei, who rely on the area for food and their daily needs. The total population is estimated to be 2,500 within 14 villages. The name of the park is derived from the Marori language in which Waisol means garden. These local communities consume fish, sago, sweet potato, deer, bandicoot and wallaby. Many aspects of their culture are disappearing although some elements such as festivals, pig feasts, dancing, weaving and traditional cooking remain. There are many sites of spiritual significance including sacred sites. The southern part of the park has large areas of ancient agricultural mounds which are of archaeological importance.

== Threats ==
Much of the park's natural flooded grassland systems are threatened by large scale changes to scrub and woodland as well as invasions of alien species such as water hyacinth and mimosa pigra. The New Guinea crocodile habitat is in danger as a consequence of skin trading. As in other parts of Indonesia and New Guinea, illegal logging has been witnessed in Wasur National Park as well.

== See also ==
- List of national parks of Indonesia
