= YUS Conservation Area =

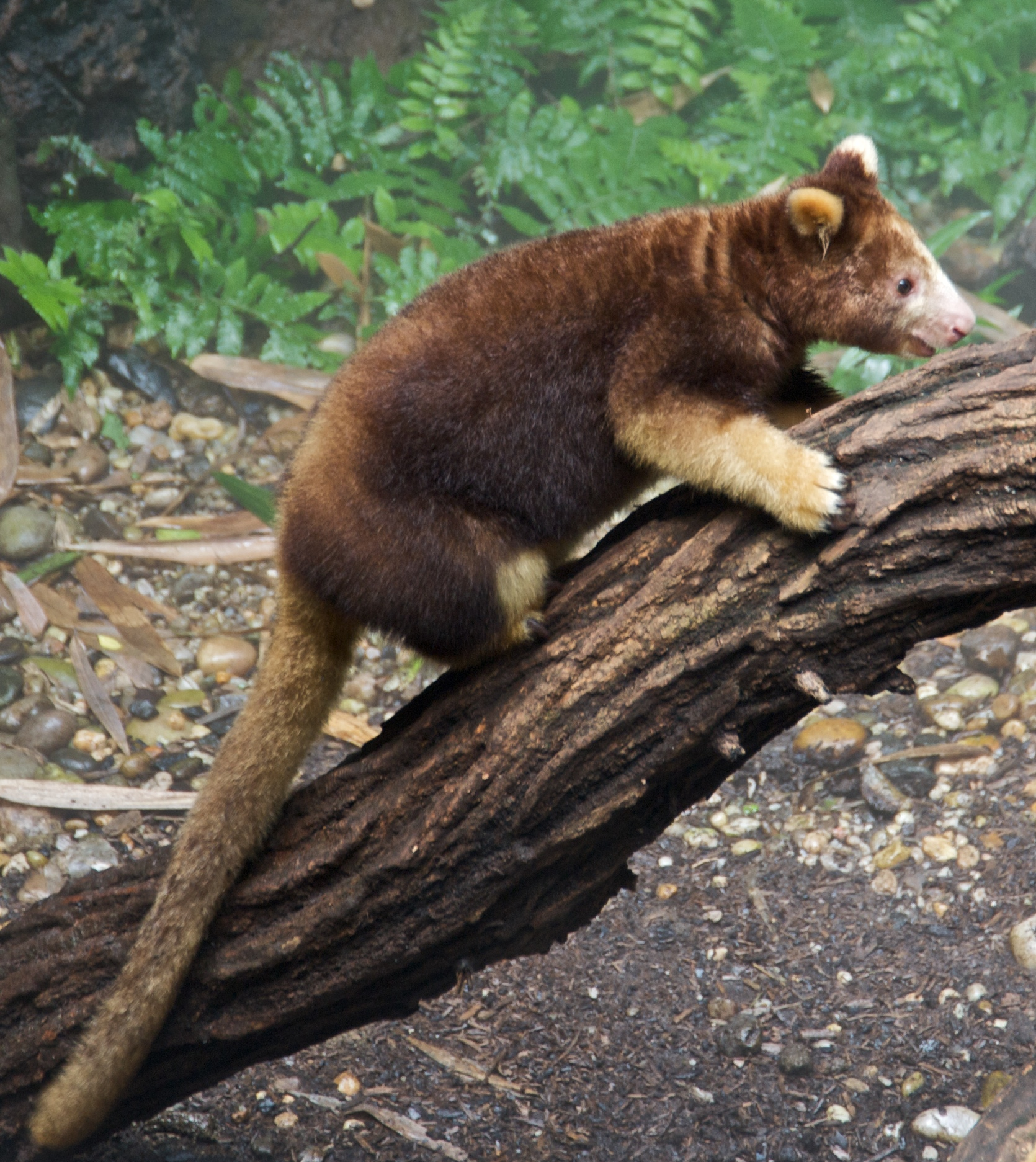
- Matschie's tree-kangaroo, an endangered endemic species found in YUS

- Location within Papua New Guinea
- Location: Morobe Province, Papua New Guinea
- Nearest city: Lae
- Coordinates: 5°53′54″S 146°48′15″E
- Area: 760 km^{2} (290 sq mi)
- Established: 2009

YUS Conservation Area is a protected area on the Huon Peninsula, Morobe Province of Papua New Guinea. It was established in 2009 as Papua New Guinea's first conservation area, and named after the Yopno, Uruwa and Som rivers that flow through it. The 760 km^{2} area of tropical forests is stretching from coral reefs off the northern coast to the 4,000-metre peaks of the western Saruwaged Mountains. It is a critical habitat for the endangered endemic Matschie's tree-kangaroo.

While the land remains under local customary ownership, villagers from 35 villages have formally committed to prohibit all hunting, logging and mining within the land that has been pledged to the conservation area.

== Flora and fauna ==
The YUS area provides habitat for 268 species of bird, 44 species of mammal and 26 species of frog. Birds include the palm cockatoo, dwarf cassowary, Pesquet's parrot, emperor bird-of-paradise, Wahnes's parotia and Huon astrapia. Mammals include the common spotted cuscus, striped possum, small dorcopsis, Brown's pademelon and mountain cuscus.

== Conservation ==
To establish the YUS Conservation Area, Woodland Park Zoo's Tree Kangaroo Conservation Program (TKCP) has worked with local landowners and the PNG government for more than 12 years. TKCP was supported by Conservation International, National Geographic, and BMU (German Ministry for Environment) through KfW (German Development Bank) as part of the International Climate Change Initiative.

A team of 12 rangers has been established in 2012, that help to map and patrol the area.

== See also ==
- Conservation in Papua New Guinea
