= Tonda Wildlife Management Area =

Protected area in Papua New Guinea

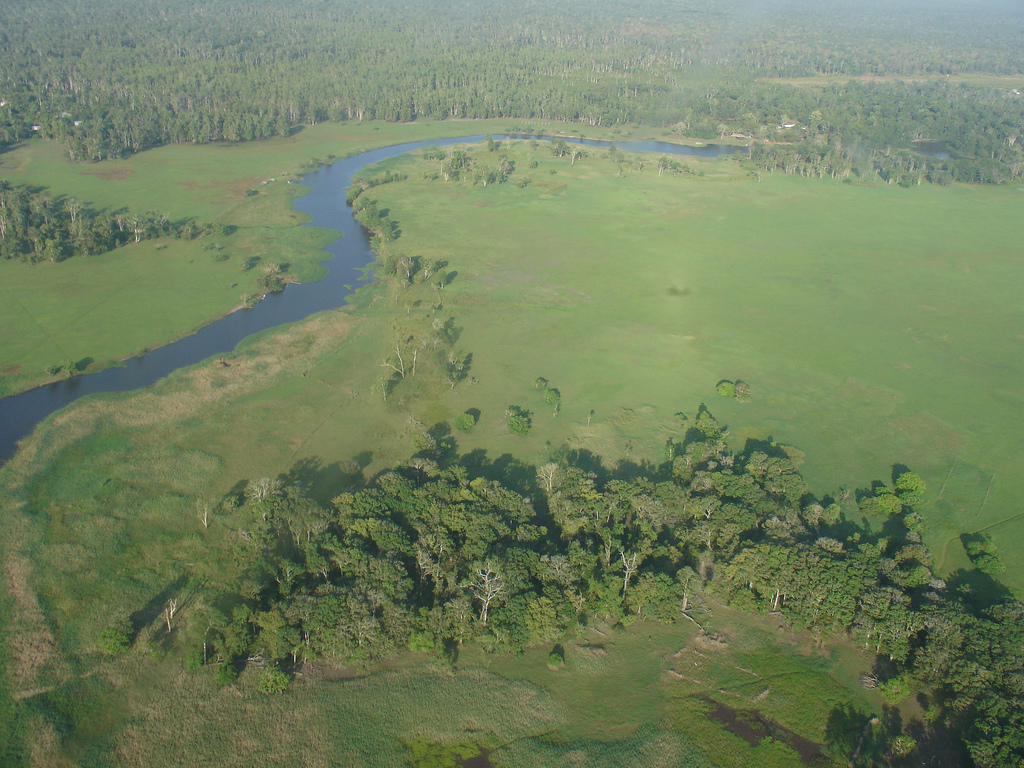
- Aerial view of the area near Bensbach airfield

- Location within Papua New Guinea
- Location: Western Province, Papua New Guinea
- Nearest city: Merauke
- Coordinates: 9°00′05″S 141°32′40″E
- Area: 5,900 km^{2} (2,300 sq mi)
- Established: 1975

Ramsar Wetland
- Designated: 16 March 1993
- Reference no.: 591

The Tonda Wildlife Management Area is a wetland of international importance and the largest protected area in Papua New Guinea. It is located in the south-western corner of the Western Province and is contiguous with Wasur National Park of Indonesia. It forms part of the Trans Fly savanna and grasslands ecoregion.

== Vegetation and fauna ==
The terrain is flat, generally less than 45 metres above sea level. It includes tidal river reaches, mangrove areas, swamps, grassland, savanna woodlands and patches of monsoon forest. Most trees are of the genus Acacia and Melaleuca while common grasses are Phragmite and Pseudoraphis.

It is an important wetland for over 250 species of resident and migratory waterbirds. Most of the World's population of little curlew stage on the plains during migration. The area also provides habitat for birds-of-paradise and brolga.

Fifty-six species of fish have been recorded. Fifty mammals are known to occur in the area, including a number not found elsewhere in New Guinea, such as the spectacled hare-wallaby, false water-rat, bronze quoll and chestnut dunnart. Reptiles include saltwater crocodile and New Guinea crocodile.

== Traditional landowners ==
The land is under customary ownership. About 1,500 subsistence gardeners and hunters live in the area in 12 villages. The western part of Tonda covers land of the Kanum peoples.

== Conservation ==
Tonda Wildlife Management Area (WMA) was established in 1975. The WMA Rules restrict hunting by non-customary land owners. In 1993 it was listed as a wetland of international importance under the Ramsar Convention. In 1995 a Tri-National Wetlands Program was initiated by WWF between Tonda WMA, Wasur NP, and the Australian Kakadu National Park, which led to a Memorandum of Understanding between the three government conservation agencies in 2002. In 2006 it was proposed as a World Heritage Site, as part of the larger Trans-Fly Complex.

== Cross-border issues ==
The WMA is the subject of poaching by people from neighbouring Papua Province, Indonesia. Local people also harvest and sell a number of wildlife resources to merchants on the other side of the border, including deer meat and antlers, candlenut, the plastra of freshwater turtles, shark fins, saratoga (Scleropages jardinii) fingerlings and the dried swim bladders of certain fish.

== See also ==
- Conservation in Papua New Guinea
