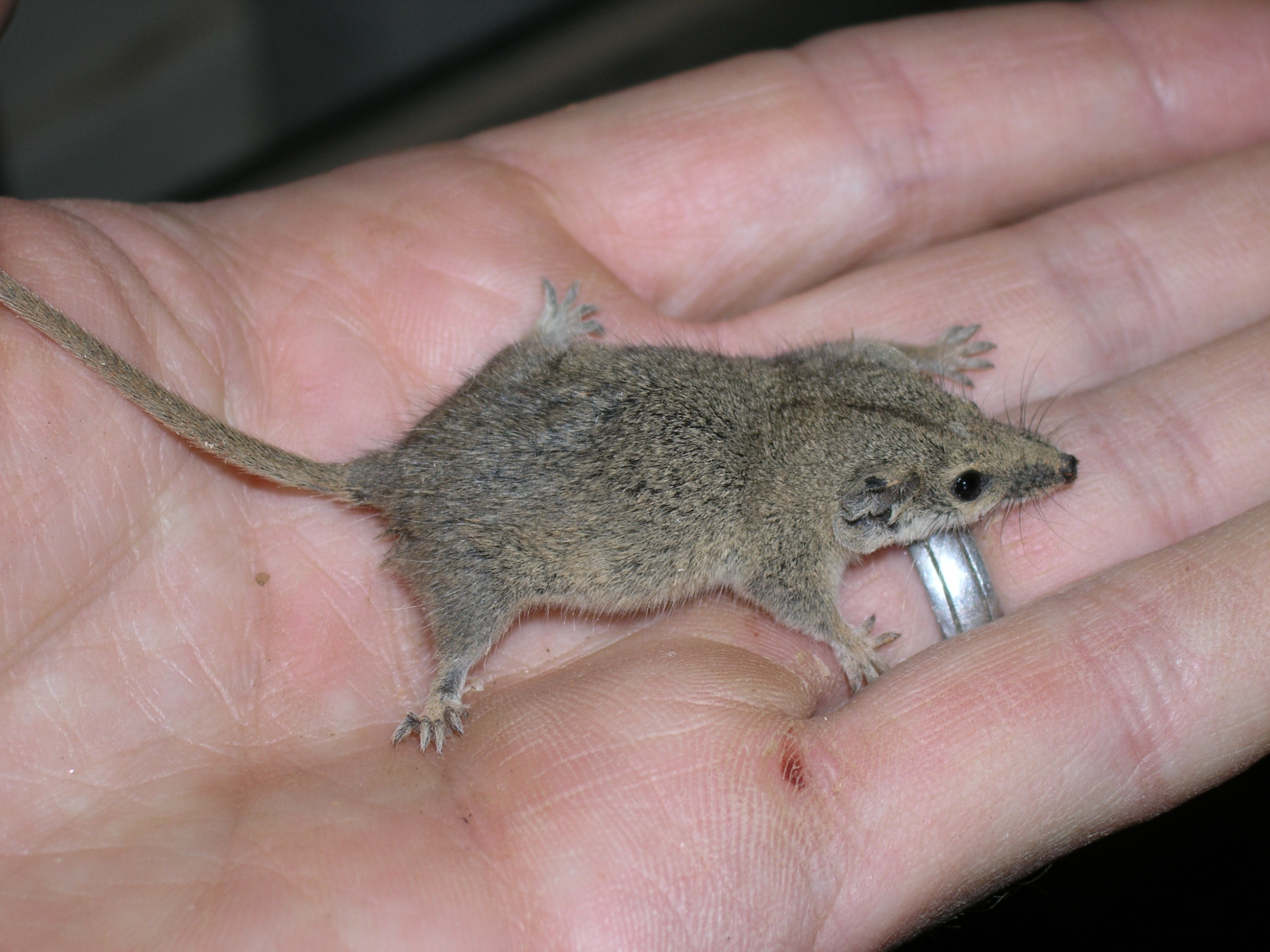
- Paucident planigale

Scientific classification
- Kingdom: Animalia
- Phylum: Chordata
- Class: Mammalia
- Infraclass: Marsupialia
- Order: Dasyuromorphia
- Family: Dasyuridae
- Subfamily: Planigalinae; Archer, 1982

= Planigalinae =

Group of marsupials

The former subfamily Planigalinae contained the planigales and the ningauis: very small marsupial carnivores native to Australia which are, like the quolls, antechinuses, dibblers, Tasmanian devil, and many others, part of the biological order Dasyuromorphia: the carnivorous marsupials. The subfamily is now contained in the Sminthopsinae subfamily, and the two genera are split between two different tribes; the planigales are by themselves in their own tribe, while the ningaui are lumped with the dunnarts and the Kultarr.

There are 8 species in 2 genera. All members of the subfamily are very small, ranging from the paucident planigale at just over 10 grams to the smallest marsupial of all, the 4.3 gram long-tailed planigale. Most are about 8 grams, or about half the size of an average mouse.

Of the 8 species, two are from the tropical northern part of the continent, the other five from the arid or semi-arid centre. Four of the five planigales have been known for many years—John Gould described the common planigale in 1851—but the paucident planigale and all three ningauis were unknown to science until the 1970s and 1980s.

All 8 species are nocturnal carnivores which hunt a range of small creatures, typically insects, larvae, insect eggs, small lizards and the young of small mammals. Although tiny, they are very bold, at least some of the species regularly take prey larger than themselves. Even the widespread common planigale, which can be found in the outer suburbs of Brisbane is poorly known. Until the improvements in biochemical analysis methods towards the end of the 20th century, very little was known about the relationships between the smaller carnivorous marsupials: it is only in recent years that it has been possible to discover that the Planigalinae are a distinct group within the Dasyuromorphia.

Family Dasyuridae

- Subfamily Dasyurinae: quolls, kowari, mulgara, kaluta, dibblers, pseudantechinuses, and the Tasmanian devil
- Subfamily Phascogalinae: phascogales and antechinuses
- Subfamily Sminthopsinae: dunnarts and the kultarr
- Subfamily Planigalinae:
  - Genus Planigale
    - Giles' planigale (Planigale gilesi)
    - Long-tailed planigale (Planigale ingrami)
    - Common planigale (Planigale maculata)
    - New Guinean planigale (Planigale novaeguineae)
    - Narrow-nosed planigale (Planigale tenuirostris)
  - Genus Ningaui
    - Wongai ningaui (Ninguai ridei)
    - Pilbara ningaui (Ninguai timealeyi)
    - Southern ningaui (Ninguai yvonneae)
