= List of mammals of South Australia =

This is a list of mammals of South Australia. It includes all mammals recorded in South Australia since European settlement, including some known only from subfossil remains, and including non-feral introduced species.

Except where otherwise referenced, this list is based upon Kemper, Catherine; Reardon, Terry; Queale, Lynette (2000). "Mammals". In Robinson, A. C.; Casperson, K. D.; Hutchinson, M. N. (eds.). A List of the Vertebrates of South Australia. Biological Survey of South Australia..

== Subclass Prototheria ==
=== Order Monotremata ===
==== Family Ornithorhynchidae ====
- Ornithorhynchus anatinus (platypus)

==== Family Tachyglossidae ====
- Tachyglossus aculeatus (short-beaked echidna)

== Subclass Marsupialia ==
=== Order Dasyuromorphia ===
==== Family Myrmecobiidae ====
- Myrmecobius fasciatus (numbat) reintroduced

==== Family Dasyuridae ====
Subfamily Dasyurinae

- Dasycercus byrnei (kowari)
- Dasycercus cristicauda (mulgara)
- Dasyurus geoffroii (western quoll) locally extinct
- Dasyurus maculatus (tiger quoll) locally extinct
- Dasyurus viverrinus (eastern quoll) locally extinct
- Pseudantechinus macdonnellensis (fat-tailed pseudantechinus)

Subfamily Phascogalinae

- Antechinus flavipes (yellow-footed antechinus)
- Antechinus minimus (swamp antechinus)
- Phascogale calura (red-tailed phascogale) locally extinct
- Phascogale tapoatafa (brush-tailed phascogale)

Subfamily Planigalinae

- Ningaui ridei (Wonai ningaui)
- Ningaui yvonneae (southern ningaui)
- Planigale gilesi (Giles' planigale)
- Planigale cf. ingrami (long-tailed planigale)
- Planigale tenuirostris (narrow-nosed planigale)

Subfamily Sminthopsinae

- Antechinomys laniger (kultarr)
- Sminthopsis aitkeni (Kangaroo Island dunnart)
- Sminthopsis crassicaudata (fat-tailed dunnart)
- Sminthopsis dolichura (little long-tailed dunnart)
- Sminthopsis hirtipes (hairy-footed dunnart)
- Sminthopsis macroura (stripe-faced dunnart)
- Sminthopsis murina (common dunnart)
- Sminthopsis ooldea (Ooldea dunnart)
- Sminthopsis psammophila (sandhill dunnart)
- Sminthopsis youngsoni (lesser hairy-footed dunnart)

=== Order Peramelemorphia ===
==== Family †Chaeropodidae ====
- †Chaeropus ecaudatus (pig-footed bandicoot)

==== Family Peramelidae ====
Subfamily Peramelinae

- Isoodon auratus (golden bandicoot) locally extinct
- Isoodon obesulus (southern brown bandicoot)
- Perameles bougainville (western barred bandicoot) locally extinct
- †Perameles eremiana (desert bandicoot)
- Perameles gunnii (eastern barred bandicoot) locally extinct

Subfamily Thylacomyinae

- Macrotis lagotis (bilby)
- †Macrotis leucura (lesser bilby)

=== Order Notoryctemorphia ===
==== Family Notoryctidae ====
- Notoryctes typhlops (marsupial mole)

=== Order Diprotodontia ===
==== Family Phascolarctidae ====
- Phascolarctos cinereus (koala) reintroduced

==== Family Vombatidae ====
- Lasiorhinus latifrons (southern hairy-nosed wombat)
- Vombatus ursinus (common wombat)

==== Family Phalangeridae ====
- Trichosurus vulpecula (common brushtail possum)

==== Family Potoroidae ====
- Bettongia lesueur (burrowing bettong)
- Bettongia penicillata (brush-tailed bettong)
- †Caloprymnus campestris (desert rat-kangaroo)
- †Potorous tridactylus (long-nosed potoroo)

==== Family Macropodidae ====
- Lagorchestes hirsutus (rufous hare-wallaby) locally extinct
- †Lagorchestes leporides (eastern hare-wallaby)
- Macropus fuliginosus (western grey kangaroo)
- Macropus giganteus (eastern grey kangaroo)
- Notamacropus eugenii (tammar wallaby) reintroduced
  - N. e. decres
  - N. e. eugenii reintroduced
- †Notamacropus greyi (toolache wallaby)
- Notamacropus rufogriseus (red-necked wallaby)
- Osphranter robustus (euro)
- Osphranter rufus (red kangaroo)
- †Onychogalea lunata (crescent nailtail wallaby)
- Petrogale lateralis (black-footed rock-wallaby)
  - P. l. pearsoni (Pearson Island rock-wallaby)
- Petrogale xanthopus (yellow-footed rock-wallaby)
- Thylogale billardierii (Tasmanian pademelon) locally extinct
- Wallabia bicolor (swamp wallaby)

==== Family Burramyidae ====
- Cercartetus concinnus (western pygmy-possum)
- Cercartetus lepidus (little pygmy-possum)
- Cercartetus nanus (eastern pygmy-possum)

==== Family Pseudocheiridae ====
- Pseudocheirus peregrinus (common ringtail possum)

==== Family Petauridae ====
- Petaurus australis (yellow-bellied glider)
- Petaurus notatus (Krefft's glider)
- Petaurus norfolcensis (squirrel glider) locally extinct

==== Acrobatidae ====
- Acrobates pygmaeus (feathertail glider)

== Subclass Eutheria ==
=== Order Chiroptera ===
==== Suborder Megachiroptera ====
===== Family Pteropodidae =====
- Pteropus poliocephalus (grey-headed flying-fox)
- Pteropus scapulatus (little red flying-fox)

==== Suborder Microchiroptera ====
===== Family Emballonuridae =====
- Saccolaimus flaviventris (yellow-bellied sheathtail bat)
- Taphozous hilli (sheathtail bat)

===== Family Megadermatidae =====
- Macroderma gigas (ghost bat) locally extinct

===== Family Molossidae =====
- Ozimops petersi (inland free-tailed bat)
- Ozimops planiceps (southern free-tailed bat)
- Ozimops ridei (eastern free-tailed bat)
- Tadarida australis (white-striped freetail-bat)

===== Family Vespertilionidae =====
Subfamily Miniopterinae

- Minipterus schreibersii (large bentwing-bat)

Subfamily Nytophilinae

- Nyctophilus geoffroyi (lesser long-eared bat)
- Nyctophilus gouldi (Gould's long-eared bat)
- Nyctophilus timoriensis (greater long-eared bat)

Subfamily Vespertilioninae

- Chalinolobus gouldii (Gould's wattled bat)
- Chalinolobus morio (chocolate wattled bat)
- Chalinolobus picatus (little pied bat)
- Falsistrellus tasmaniensis (eastern falsistrelle)
- Myotis macropus (southern myotis)
- Scotorepens balstoni (inland broad-nosed bat)
- Scotorepens greyii (little broad-nosed bat)
- Vespadelus baverstocki (inland forest bat)
- Vespadelus darlingtoni (large forest bat)
- Vespadelus finlaysoni (Finlayson's cave bat)
- Vespadelus regulus (southern forest bat)
- Vespadelus vulturnus (little forest bat)

=== Order Carnivora ===
==== Family Canidae ====
- Canis familiaris dingo (dingo)
  - Canis familiaris x C. f. dingo (dingo-domestic dog hybrid)
- Vulpes vulpes (red fox) introduced

==== Family Otariidae ====
Subfamily Arctocephalinae

- Arctocephalus pusillus (Australian fur-seal)
  - Arctocephalus pusillus doriferus
- Arctophoca forsteri (long-nosed fur-seal)
- Arctophoca tropicalis (subantarctic fur-seal)

Subfamily Otariinae

- Neophoca cinerea (Australian sea-lion)

==== Family Phocidae ====
- Hydrurga leptonyx (leopard seal)
- Leptonychotes weddellii (Weddell seal)
- Lobodon carcinophaga (crab-eater seal)
- Mirounga leonina (southern elephant seal)
- Ommatophoca rossii (Ross seal)

=== Order Cetacea ===
==== Family Balaenidae ====
- Eubalaena australis (southern right whale)

==== Family Neobalaenidae ====
- Caperea marginata (pygmy right whale)

==== Family Balaenopteridae ====
- Balaenoptera acutorostrata (dwarf minke whale)
- Balaenoptera bonaerensis (Antarctic minke whale)
- Balaenoptera borealis (sei whale)
- Balaenoptera edeni (Bryde's whale)
- Balaenoptera omurai (Omura's whale)
- Balaenoptera musculus (blue whale)
- Balaenoptera physalus (fin whale)
- Megaptera novaeangliae (humpback whale)

==== Suborder Odontoceti ====
===== Family Delphinidae =====
- Delphinus delphis (common dolphin)
- Globicephala macrorhynchus (short-finned pilot whale)
- Globicephala melas (long-finned pilot whale)
- Grampus griseus (Risso's dolphin)
- Orcinus orca (killer whale)
- Pseudorca crassidens (false killer whale)
- Sagmatias obscurus (dusky dolphin)
- Tursiops truncatus (common bottlenose dolphin)
- Tursiops aduncus (Indian Ocean bottlenose dolphin)

===== Family Phocoenidae =====
- Phocoena dioptrica (spectacled porpoise)

===== Family Physeteridae =====
- Physeter macrocephalus (sperm whale)

===== Family Kogiidae =====
- Kogia breviceps (pygmy sperm whale)
- Kogia sima (dwarf sperm whale)

===== Family Ziphiidae =====
- Berardius arnuxii (Arnoux's beaked whale)
- Hyperoodon planifrons (southern bottlenose whale)
- Mesoplodon bowdoini (Andrews beaked whale)
- Mesoplodon grayi (Gray's beaked whale)
- Mesoplodon hectori (Hector's beaked whale)
- Mesoplodon layardii (strap-toothed whale)
- Tasmacetus shepherdi (Shepherd's beaked whale)
- Ziphius cavirostris (Cuvier's beaked whale)

=== Order Artiodactyla ===
==== Family Cervidae ====
- Dama dama (common fallow deer) introduced

=== Order Rodentia ===
==== Family Muridae ====
Subfamily Hydromyinae

- Conilurus albipes (white-footed tree-rat) locally extinct (Note: never collected live in South Australia, but reported by John Gould in 1863, and remains have since been found in subfossil deposits)
- Hydromys chrysogaster (water-rat)
- Leggadina forresti (Forrest's mouse)
- †Leporillus apicalis (lesser stick-nest rat)
- Leporillus conditor (greater stick-nest rat) (Note: locally extinct on mainland; native populations remain on the Franklin Islands; introduced on Reevesby and St Peter Islands)
- Notomys alexis (spinifex hopping-mouse)
- †Notomys amplus (short-tailed hopping-mouse)
- Notomys cervinus (fawn hopping-mouse)
- Notomys fuscus (dusky hopping-mouse)
- †Notomys longicaudatus (long-tailed hopping-mouse)
- Notomys mitchellii (Mitchell's hopping-mouse)
- Pseudomys apodemoides (silky mouse)
- Pseudomys australis (plains mouse)
- Pseudomys bolami (Bolam's mouse)
- Pseudomys desertor (desert mouse)
- Pseudomys fieldi (Shark Bay mouse) locally extinct (Note: known in South Australia only from subfossil deposits, which are difficult to distinguish from those of P. gouldii)
- †Pseudomys gouldii (Gould's mouse)
- Pseudomys hermannsburgensis (sandy inland mouse)
- Pseudomys shortridgei (heath rat)

Subfamily Murinae

- Mus musculus (house mouse) introduced
- Rattus fuscipes (bush rat)
- Rattus lutreolus (swamp rat)
- Rattus norvegicus (brown rat) introduced
- Rattus rattus (black rat) introduced
- Rattus tunneyi (pale field-rat) locally extinct
- Rattus villosissimus (long-haired rat)

=== Order Lagomorpha ===
==== Family Leporidae ====
- Lepus europaeus (European hare) introduced
- Oryctolagus cuniculus (European rabbit) introduced
