= Cracking-clay Pilbara planigale =

Scientific classification
- Kingdom: Animalia
- Phylum: Chordata
- Class: Mammalia
- Infraclass: Marsupialia
- Order: Dasyuromorphia
- Family: Dasyuridae
- Genus: Planigale
- Species: P. tealei

Binomial name
- Planigale tealei Aplin, Cooper, Travouillon & Umbrello, 2023

Species of marsupial

The cracking-clay Pilbara planigale (Planigale tealei), formerly known as Planigale sp. Mt Tom Price, is a species of planigale first described in 2023. It is one of the smallest planigales, making it one of the smallest of all marsupials and mammals. The cracking-clay Pilbara planigale lives in the Pilbara region of Western Australia, where it co-occurs with the similar and also newly recognised orange-headed Pilbara planigale (P. kendricki). Both species had historically been mistaken for either the common planigale (P. maculata), or long-tailed planigale (P. ingrami); neither of which are now known to occur in the Pilbara.

== Taxonomy ==
The cracking-clay Pilbara planigale was described in 2023 by Linette Umbrello and colleagues, who used genetic and morphological information to separate it from other previously recognized species of Planigale. No subspecies are recognized.

== Description ==
The cracking-clay Pilbara planigale has the flat, wedge-shaped head characteristic of planigales and is very small; one of the smallest planigales. Compared to the co-occurring orange-headed Pilbara planigale (P. kendricki), the cracking-clay Pilbara planigale is much smaller, with a shorter head length (<20mm), smaller body weight (mostly <6g; average ~4g). a shorter and more wedge-shaped head, and darker brown/reddish tinged head colouration. Other useful field identifiers include a manus much shorter than pes, and being known almost only from cracking clays.

The cracking-clay Pilbara planigale has a maximum recorded body weight of 6.1 g and snout-vent length of 62.5 mm for males. Females tend to be slightly smaller than males, with a maximum weight of 4.7 g and snout-vent length of 60 mm (Table 4). The ratio of tail length to snout-vent length was 86‒128% (mean 109%) for males and 85‒135% (mean 110%) for females. There is no obvious sexual dimorphism in body proportions or colouration.

== Diet ==
Like all planigales, it is carnivorous, living on invertebrates and small vertebrates which they catch by energetic nocturnal hunting through leaf litter and in soil cracks.

By night, planigales are active and fearless hunters, preying mostly on insects and their larvae, small lizards, and young mammals almost as large as itself. With the larger prey like grasshoppers, an initial pounce is often insufficient and the planigale bites repeatedly until its prey no longer struggles.

== Reproduction ==
Females with up to 12 button nipples and a developing antero-lateral skin fold have been collected from March to July. Specimens collected in October and November have extended nipples and more prominent pouch due to a better developed antero-lateral skin fold.

== Distribution and habitat ==
The cracking-clay Pilbara planigale has almost always been captured on cracking clay substrates, and appears to prefer heavy soils with high clay content. Compared to the co-occurring orange-headed Pilbara planigale (P. kendricki), it is less likely to occur in habitats with abundant rocky outcrops.

== See also ==
- List of living mammal species described in the 2020s
