= Orange-headed Pilbara planigale =

Scientific classification
- Kingdom: Animalia
- Phylum: Chordata
- Class: Mammalia
- Infraclass: Marsupialia
- Order: Dasyuromorphia
- Family: Dasyuridae
- Genus: Planigale
- Species: P. kendricki

Binomial name
- Planigale kendricki Aplin, Cooper, Travouillon & Umbrello, 2023

Species of marsupials

The orange-headed Pilbara planigale (Planigale kendricki), formerly known as Planigale 1, is a species of planigale first described in 2023, and is one of the smallest of all mammals. The orange-headed Pilbara planigale lives in the Pilbara region of Western Australia, where it co-occurs with the similar and also newly recognised cracking-clay Pilbara planigale (P. tealei). Both species had historically been mistaken for either the common planigale (P. maculata), or long-tailed planigale (P. ingrami), neither of which are now known to occur in the Pilbara.

== Taxonomy ==
The orange-headed Pilbara planigale was described in 2023 by Linette Umbrello and colleagues, who used genetic and morphological information to separate it from other previously recognized species of Planigale. No subspecies are recognized.

== Description ==
The orange-headed Pilbara planigale has the flat, wedge-shaped head characteristic of planigales and is slightly smaller than a house mouse in both length and weight. Compared to the co-occurring cracking-clay Pilbara planigale (P. tealei), the orange-headed Pilbara planigale is larger, with a longer head length (greater than 20 mm or 0.79 in), larger body weight (mostly >4g; average ~7g). a pointier nose, and brighter orange/tan head colouration, with an orange eye-ring. Other useful field identifiers include a manus slightly shorter than pes, and living in a variety of habitats (including rocky, sandy and heavier soils), while P. tealei is almost only known from cracking clays.

The orange-headed Pilbara planigale has a maximum recorded body weight of 12.5 g (0.44 oz) and snout–vent length of 74 mm (2.9 in) for males. Females tend to be slightly smaller than males, with a maximum weight of 9.5 g (0.34 oz) and snout–vent length 69 mm (2.7 in). The ratio of tail length to snout–vent length was 87–129% (mean 106%) for males and 83‒129% (mean 108%) for females. There is no obvious sexual dimorphism in colouration or proportions.

== Diet ==
Like all planigales, it is carnivorous, living on invertebrates and small vertebrates which they catch by energetic nocturnal hunting through leaf litter and in soil cracks.

By night, planigales are active and fearless hunters, preying mostly on insects and their larvae, small lizards, and young mammals almost as large as itself. With the larger prey like grasshoppers, an initial pounce is often insufficient and the planigale bites repeatedly until its prey no longer struggles.

== Reproduction ==
Females with poorly developed pouches and up to 12 button nipples have been collected from April to August. Individuals with enlarged nipples and more obvious pouch development and some with pouch young have been collected in September, October and November.

== Distribution and habitat ==
The orange-headed Pilbara planigale occurs on a variety of substrates from sandy plains adjacent to rocky areas, through rocky scree slopes and cobbled creek beds. On a widescale biodiversity survey of the Pilbara, it was found at almost half the survey sites, and found to prefer rugged substrates with exposed bedrock. Tussock grasses of the genus Triodia are a constant feature of its environment.

== See also ==
- List of living mammal species described in the 2020s
