= Kryptos (disambiguation) =

Kryptos is an encrypted sculpture on the grounds of the US Central Intelligence Agency.

Kryptos may also refer to:

- Kryptos (gastropod), a genus of marine snails in the family Buccinidae
- Kryptos (band), an Indian heavy metal band
- "Kryptos", an episode of the British television series Eleventh Hour
- Kryptos, an album by Andreas Vollenweider

== See also ==
- Kryptops, a genus of theropod dinosaur
- Cryptos, in the list of Dan Dare stories
- Krypto (disambiguation)
- Krypton, the chemical element named after Kryptos, ancient Greek word meaning "hidden"
- Krypton (comics), the fictional planet Superman is from in the DC Universe
