= Arnhem Plateau planigale =

Scientific classification
- Kingdom: Animalia
- Phylum: Chordata
- Class: Mammalia
- Infraclass: Marsupialia
- Order: Dasyuromorphia
- Family: Dasyuridae
- Genus: Planigale
- Species: P. petrophila

Binomial name
- Planigale petrophila Umbrello, Travouillon, Baker, Westerman, 2026

Species of marsupial

The Arnhem Plateau planigale (Planigale petrophila) is a species of cryptic dasyurid endemic to the Northern Territory. It was identified through genetic studies conducted on the two holotype specimens in 2017. It is only known from 3 museum specimens.

== Description ==
It is medium-sized planigale with a snout to vent length of 60 to 69.5 millimetres and a tail to vent length of 80.5 to 91.9 millimetres. It has the longest tail length of any members of its genus, ranging from 80.5 to 91.9 millimetres.
