= Kimberley planigale =

Scientific classification
- Kingdom: Animalia
- Phylum: Chordata
- Class: Mammalia
- Infraclass: Marsupialia
- Order: Dasyuromorphia
- Family: Dasyuridae
- Genus: Planigale
- Species: P. subtilissima

Binomial name
- Planigale subtilissima Lönnberg, 1913

Synonyms
- Planigale ingrami subtilissima Archer, 1976

Species of marsupial

The Kimberley planigale (Planigale subtilissima) is a species of small carnivorous marsupial native to the Kimberley region of northwest Australia. It was described initially by the Swedish zoologist Einar Lönnberg in 1913 and has variously been described as a distinct species or subspecies of the long-tailed planigale (Planigale ingrami). The species was reinstated as a separate taxon in 2026.

== Description ==
It was described by Lönnberg as similar in appearance to P. ingrami but smaller. It is one of the smallest species of planigale and marsupial with an average head to body length of 58.35 millimetres for males and 52.3 millimetres for females as well as an average tail length of 63.25 millimetres for males and 58.92 millimetres for females.
