= Cryptic =

Cryptic may refer to:

== Arts and entertainment ==
- Cryptic (album), by Edge of Sanity, 1997
- Cryptic, a music project of Brownmark
- Cryptic crossword, a type of word puzzle
- Cryptic Studios, a video game developer
- Cryptics, characters from the role playing game Demon: The Fallen

== Science ==
- Cryptic species complex, morphologically identical lineages of a species that are genetically distinct
- Crypsis, the ability of animals to blend in to avoid observation

== See also ==
- Crypsis (disambiguation)
- Crypto (disambiguation)
- List of cryptids, animals or other beings whose present existence is disputed or unsubstantiated by science
