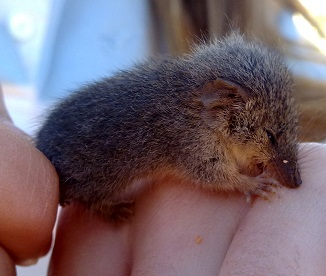
- Southern ningaui

Scientific classification
- Kingdom: Animalia
- Phylum: Chordata
- Class: Mammalia
- Infraclass: Marsupialia
- Order: Dasyuromorphia
- Family: Dasyuridae
- Subfamily: Sminthopsinae
- Tribe: Sminthopsini
- Genus: Ningaui; Archer, 1975

Type species
- Ningaui timealeyi Archer, 1975

Species
- N. ridei; N. timealeyi; N. yvonneae

= Ningaui =

Ningauis

Genus of marsupials

Ningaui is a genus of small species of the marsupial dasyurid family. Along with the planigales, they are among the smallest marsupials.

== Taxonomy ==
The genus was established in 1975 to accommodate two newly described species of dasyurids, the type species Ningaui timealeyi and Ningaui ridei. The author, Mike Archer, compared his specimens to those of Sminthopsis (the dunnarts), distinguishing the new taxon by the structure of the skull, the hindfoot, features of dentition and their smaller size, morphology that was presumed to be specialisations to a more arid environment. The author provided a diagnosis of two species that distinguished the populations by further details of cranial and dental characters. Archer notes the tentative alliance of the species to the genus Planigale by W. D. L. Ride in 1970, and provided a new definition of that genus to separate the new taxa.

The three species of the genus are:

- Wongai ningaui, Ningaui ridei
- Pilbara ningaui, Ningaui timealeyi
- Southern ningaui, Ningaui yvonneae

The name "ningaui" refers to a creature from Aboriginal myth. Archer refers to a published story of minute hairy creatures that emerged at night and ate their food uncooked, as an apt description the new genus.

== Description ==
A genus of Dasyuridae. The tails of the species are all thin and lack any crest of brush-like fur, and equal to or greater in length than the head-body measurement.

All ningaui are nocturnal hunters of invertebrates. In appearance they resemble mice or similar small rodents, but can be distinguished by their pointed snouts. The genus Ningaui was one of the last of the Australian marsupial genera to be erected; this occurred with the surprise discovery of the Wongai ningaui (N. ridei) and the Pilbara ningaui (N. timealeyi) in 1975.

All species are found in Australia and restricted to arid regions of the south coast, central deserts and northwest of the continent.
