= Pilbara ningaui =

Conservation status
- Least Concern (IUCN 3.1)

Scientific classification
- Kingdom: Animalia
- Phylum: Chordata
- Class: Mammalia
- Infraclass: Marsupialia
- Order: Dasyuromorphia
- Family: Dasyuridae
- Genus: Ningaui
- Species: N. timealeyi

Binomial name
- Ningaui timealeyi Archer, 1975
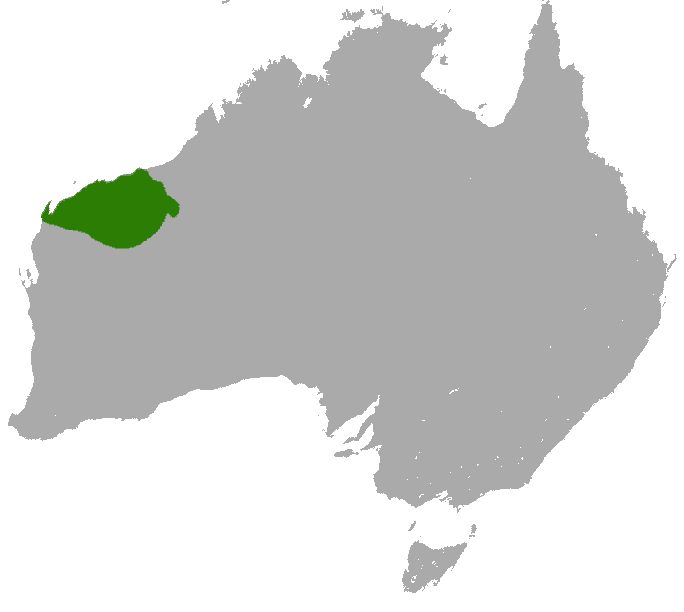
- Pilbara ningaui range

Species of marsupial

The Pilbara ningaui (Ningaui timealeyi), sometimes known as Ealey's ningaui, is a tiny species of marsupial carnivore found in Australia.

== Taxonomy ==
The species was described by Mike Archer in 1975, distinguishing the new taxon from other dasyurids by nominating it as the type species of a new genus. Archer provided a description for a second species of Ningaui, the more widely distributed Ningaui ridei. The holotype is a specimen obtained escaping a fire in spinifex country, a collection made by A. Snell in 1963 at Mount Robinson in the northwest of Australia. Other material examined included a specimen collected in 1957 by E. H. M. Ealey of Monash University, then working as a field officer for the CSIRO, his informal name, 'Tim' Ealey. is the eponym of the specific epithet.

== Description ==
The Pilbara ningaui is a very small species of marsupial, 45 to 58 mm (1.8 to 2.3 in) in length. The fur is spiky and dishevelled in appearance, the upper parts are a mix of ginger and brown hairs, or grey-brown, with a rufous colouration across the flanks, ears and face. The eyes are close-set and the muzzle is long and pointed. The tail is 60 to 76 mm (2.4 to 3.0 in) long and they weigh from 5 to 9.4 g (0.18 to 0.33 oz). The females possess six teats, fewer than others of the genus.

This makes the Pilbara ningaui among of the smallest of all marsupials, surpassed only by the planigales. It is partly arboreal, and differs from others of the genus in its smaller size and rufous-tinted face.

== Distribution and habitat ==
The species is found in the Pilbara and Gascoyne regions of Western Australia, extending into the Little Sandy Desert. Ningaui timealeyi is recorded as locally common in some locations, such as the Hamersley Range, but is not frequently occur outside of these areas.

== Behaviour ==
A partly arboreal species that forages in the dense undergrowth. Breeding is dependent on the extent of seasonal rain in the region, beginning in September and rearing of young continuing as late as March. The size of each litter may be four to six young.

== See also ==
- Smallest organisms
