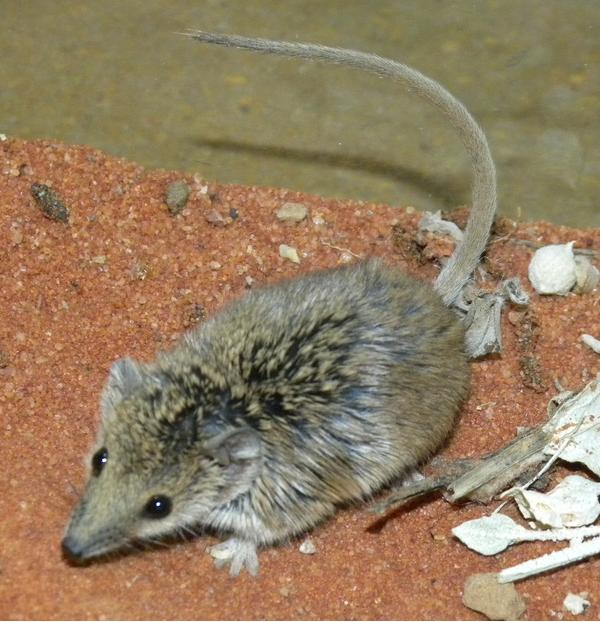

Conservation status
- Least Concern (IUCN 3.1)

Scientific classification
- Kingdom: Animalia
- Phylum: Chordata
- Class: Mammalia
- Infraclass: Marsupialia
- Order: Dasyuromorphia
- Family: Dasyuridae
- Genus: Planigale
- Species: P. tenuirostris

Binomial name
- Planigale tenuirostris Troughton, 1928
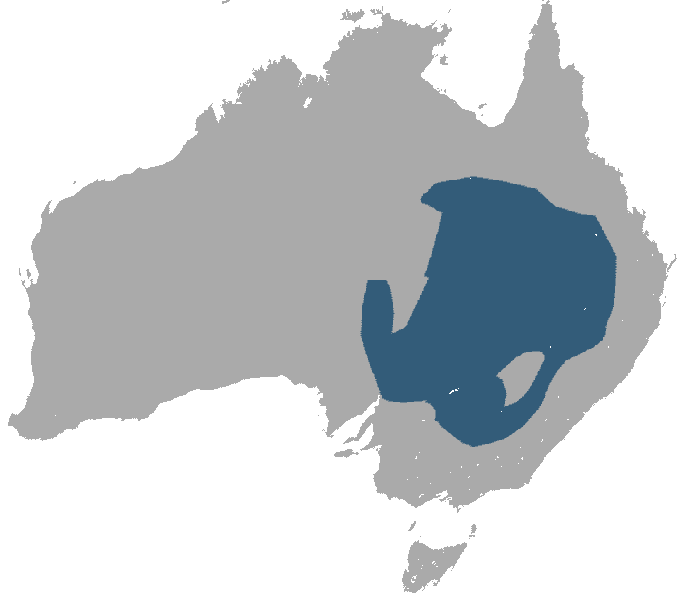
- Narrow-nosed planigale range

= Narrow-nosed planigale =

Species of marsupial

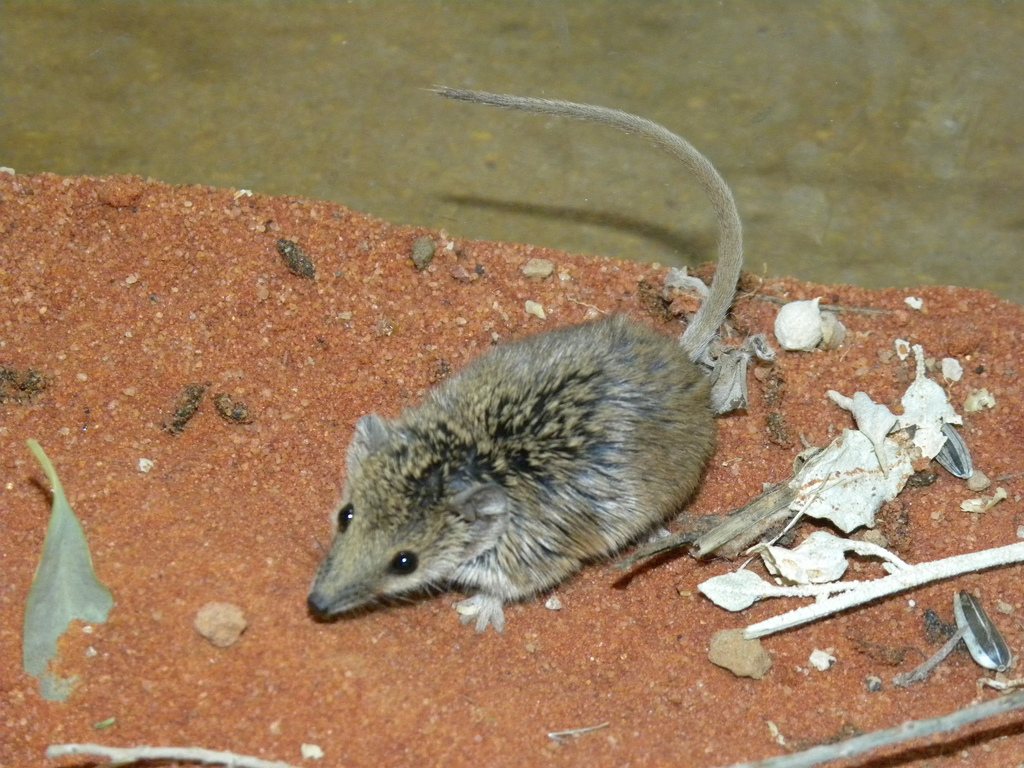
Planigale tenuirostris

The narrow-nosed planigale (Planigale tenuirostris) is a small Australian carnivorous marsupial of the family Dasyuridae.

The narrow-nosed planigale was described by Ellis Le Geyt Troughton in 1928, separating it from the common planigale (P. maculata) with which it had previously been associated.

The scientific name for the species means "slender-snouted flat-weasel".

== Description ==
Planigales are small rodent-like marsupials no greater than 7.5 cm, and weighing less than 10 g. The narrow-nosed planigale differs from other planigales in its more rufous colouring and smaller size – only the long-tailed planigale is smaller. It is an active hunter of various invertebrates, and is known as a fearless and pugnacious predator. Its flattened head is used as a wedge to prize apart grass stems and turn over leaves in the leaf litter. It will often attack prey larger than itself.

== Ecology & behaviour ==
=== Diet ===
The narrow-nosed Planigale are generalist insectivores, able to thrive and with a diet that reflects the available prey of their environment. Their diet mostly consists of arthropods including beetles, centipedes and spiders, but can also include reptiles such as small lizards.

=== Habitat ===
The narrow-nosed Planigale prefers an open less densely vegetated area (Read, 1987). They can often be found in tussock grassland and low shrubland with cracking clay soils so as to inhabit the soil cavities. (Moss, 1988) Plant height has also been recorded as positively associated with an abundance of P. tenuirostris.

=== Behaviour ===
Unlike other Planigale species, the narrow-nosed Planigale is nocturnal in both summer and winter (Read, 1989) spending only minimal bursts of activity. Research has recorded past short-term activity cycles as 1 hr 25 min in summer and 2 hr 56 min in winter (Read, 1989) Narrow-nosed Planigale surface from the cracks to hunt during the night or stay within these cracks clinging to the vertical sides.

=== Lifecycle & reproduction ===
Breeding season runs from July to Mid-January and coincides with food availability during Spring & Summer (Read, 1984). Females have 12 teats and a pouch. Females reach their sexual maturity (for reproduction) on average at 240 days. Females are only in heat (Estrus) for one day, on a 33-day cycle (Read, 1985). In males, the process of sperm production (spermatogenesis) begins in July and ends the following March(aspermatogenesis). The average gestation period lasts just 19 days. The young detach from the teats at a month after birth and mothers begin weaning the young at three months (Read, 1985) In captivity females give birth to two litters with an average of six young annually, but in the wild it is more likely only a single litter will be produced (Read 2008).

== Threats to survival ==
Population densities tend to fluctuate from year to year, however, despite some declines in distribution, this species appears stable.

=== Habitat degradation ===
There appear to be no major or widespread threats to the narrow-nosed Planigale species. Localised threats and population declines occur in the form of habitat conversion or destruction, particularly for agricultural use.

=== Predators ===
As a result of its habitat (below ground) and hunting habits (within soil cracks), it is protected from most larger predatory species (Moss, 1988).

=== Changes in rainfall ===
Research has postulated that fluctuations in rainfall affect the populations of Planigale gilesi and P. tenuirostris (Read, 1988), however little other research has been done into this to confirm whether it is rainfall alone, or the byproduct effect on resources.

== Distribution ==
The narrow-nosed planigale is found in New South Wales, Queensland, South Australia and the Northern Territory in a wide range of inland habitats. It prefers areas with cracked clay soil.
