= Crypsis (disambiguation) =

Crypsis is the ability of an animal or a plant to avoid observation.

- Crypsis, in a species complex, the inability to be distinguished morphologically from one another
- Crypsis (genus), a genus of African and Eurasian plants in the grass family, sometimes referred to as pricklegrass

== See also ==
- Cryptic (disambiguation)
- Cryptozoology, a pseudoscience that searches for disputed or unsubstantiated animals
  - List of cryptids, animals or other beings whose present existence is disputed or unsubstantiated by science
