= Crypto =

Crypto may refer to:

== Cryptography ==
- Cryptography, the practice and study of techniques for secure communication
- CRYPTO, an annual cryptography conference
- Crypto++, a cryptographic algorithm software library
- Crypto AG, defunct Swiss cryptography company

== Cryptocurrency ==
- Cryptocurrency, a type of digital currency based on cryptography
  - List of cryptocurrencies
- Crypto.com, a cryptocurrency exchange

== Other uses ==
- Cryptosporidium, sometimes called crypto, a parasite
  - Cryptosporidiosis, sometimes called crypto, an intestinal disease
- Crypto (book), a 2001 cryptography book by Steven Levy
- Crypto (film), a 2019 American crime drama thriller film
- Crypto, a character in the video game Apex Legends
- Crypto, the main protagonist of Destroy All Humans! videogame series

== See also ==
- Crypsis (disambiguation)
- Cryptanalysis, the study of methods for obtaining the meaning of encrypted information
- Cryptococcus, a genus of fungus
  - Cryptococcosis, a disease
- Crypto Wars, governmental attempts to limit access to strong cryptography
- Cripto, a protein-coding gene
- Krypto, also known as Krypto the Superdog, in the DC superhero franchise
  - Krypto the Superdog (TV series)
- Krypto (game), a mathematical strategy card game
