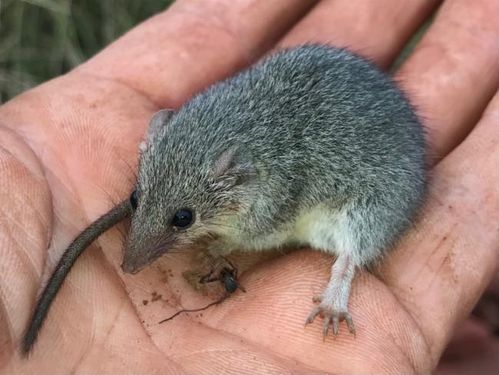
- Ningaui ridei, observed in Australia by Robert Browne-Cooper

Conservation status
- Least Concern (IUCN 3.1)

Scientific classification
- Kingdom: Animalia
- Phylum: Chordata
- Class: Mammalia
- Infraclass: Marsupialia
- Order: Dasyuromorphia
- Family: Dasyuridae
- Genus: Ningaui
- Species: N. ridei

Binomial name
- Ningaui ridei Archer, 1975
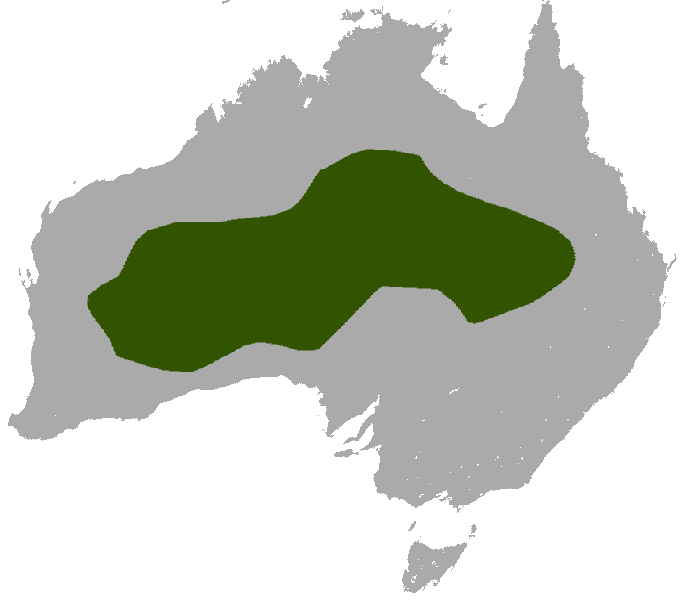
- Wongai ningaui range

= Wongai ningaui =

Species of marsupial

The Wongai ningaui (Ningaui ridei) is a tiny carnivorous marsupial native to the arid open grasslands of inland Australia. Their diet is mainly small insects, and occasionally larger prey such as spiders, grasshoppers and cockroaches, which they forage for at the ground and in clumps of spinifex. They have long and untidy fur, grey or gingery brown with longer black hairs, small ears, a narrow muzzle, and possess a partially prehensile tail and feet that allow them to climb. The population occurs sparsely across a wide area and common in favourable habitat, especially in years of good rainfall. Ningaui ridei was first described in 1975, one of two species of a new genus discovered amongst the poorly known mammals of the western regions of Australia.

== Taxonomy ==
Ningaui ridei and the Pilbara species, Ningaui timealeyi, were two species of Ningaui described by Australian biologist Mike Archer when the genus was erected in 1975 (the southern species, Ningaui yvonneae, would be described in 1983), although the Pilbara ningaui was designated the type species. The Wongai ningaui was described from two subadult specimens collected near Laverton in Western Australia. The scientific name of this species honours the Australian naturalist W. D. L. Ride, who recognised the paraphyly of specimens that had been assigned to Planigale, including some that Archer placed with the new species.

The common name Wongai ningaui was recognised in the 2001 census of Australian vertebrates; the species is also referred to Ride's ningaui.

== Description ==
A species of Ningaui. with a combined head and body length of 58 to 75 millimetres (2.3 to 3.0 in), tail length of 60 to 70 mm (2.4 to 2.8 in) and weight range of 6.5 to 10.5 grams (0.23 to 0.37 oz). The females present 6 to 8 teats. The appearance of the pelage is spiky and dishevelled, with grey hair mixed with brown or ginger; the obvious guard hairs are black. The ears do not extend far above the fur at the crown of the head, the eyes are close set and relatively small, and their face narrows at the muzzle. A gingery colour appears at the side of the head and at the lower parts of the ears. Flanks are a yellow-grey colour, and the ventral side is whitish.

Ningaui ridei occurs with the superficially similar species Ningaui yvonneae in a narrow overlap of their distribution range west of Kalgoorlie, they may be distinguished in the field by the length of the first toe. The first toe of the hindfoot is level with the interdigital pads at the lower surface, a diagnosis that separates this species from the shorter toe of N. yvonneae.

Even smaller than a house mouse, the Wongai ningaui is greyish above and lighter below. It has a semi-prehensile tail, needle sharp teeth and a long snout. The name ningaui derives from an Aboriginal word for tiny mythological beings that are hairy, have short feet and only come out at night. Ningauis use their sharp teeth to kill their insect prey by swiftly biting them around the head. They hunt by night and rest among the spinifex hummocks by day. The females have as many as five to seven young, the breeding season beginning in October.

== Distribution and habitat ==
The Wongai ningaui lives mostly in the interior of Australia, on dunes or sandplains that have spinifex, or grasslands and occasional trees such as acacias, desert oaks and mulga, Australian Cypress Pine and arid heathland plants. The distribution range begins west of Kalgoorlie in Western Australia across northern South Australia and southern Northern Territory to southwestern Queensland. They are sparsely distributed but may be locally common. The population decreases if annual rainfall is low.

== Behaviour ==
A solitary and nocturnal animal that resides in hummocks of Triodia, or within a log, or tunnel just below the ground. They forage for invertebrates, most of which are insects less than ten millimetres, but may pursue larger prey such as spiders, grasshoppers and cockroaches. When conditions are unsuitable the species is able to reduce its requirements by entering a state of torpor. The litter size is five to seven young, these remain at a nest site until six weeks and gain independence by thirteen weeks; only a few young survive to reproduce in the next season. The female bears young during September to October and may rear a second litter in the same year.

== Conservation ==
The IUCN Red List assessed the conservation status of the species in 2015 as least concern, with a population that is unlikely to be in decline and not meeting the criteria of a greater threat of extinction. Ningaui ridei is found within protected areas and conservation reserves in parts of its distribution range. Regional authorities, in Queensland and the Northern Territory, also list this species by the conservation status least concern.
