= New Guinean planigale =

Conservation status
- Least Concern (IUCN 3.1)

Scientific classification
- Kingdom: Animalia
- Phylum: Chordata
- Class: Mammalia
- Infraclass: Marsupialia
- Order: Dasyuromorphia
- Family: Dasyuridae
- Genus: Planigale
- Species: P. novaeguineae

Binomial name
- Planigale novaeguineae Tate & Archbold, 1941
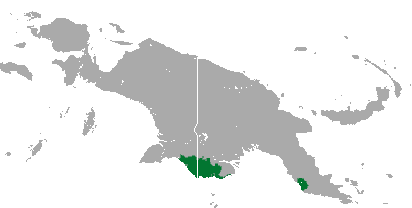
- New Guinean planigale range

Species of marsupial

The New Guinean planigale (Planigale novaeguineae), also known as the Papuan planigale, is a species of small marsupial carnivore native to the Trans-Fly savanna and grasslands of New Guinea.
