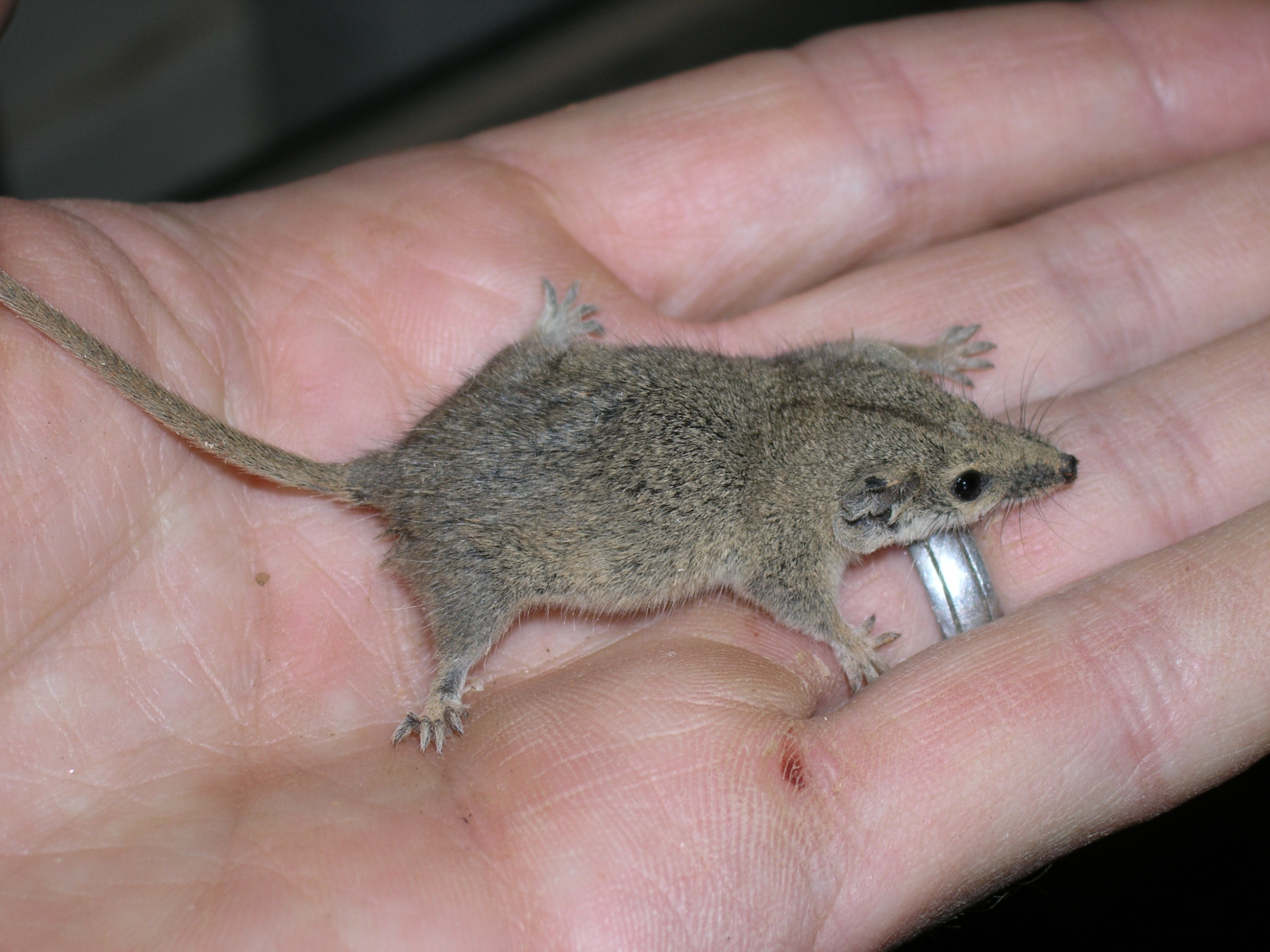
- Paucident planigale

Conservation status
- Least Concern (IUCN 3.1)

Scientific classification
- Kingdom: Animalia
- Phylum: Chordata
- Class: Mammalia
- Infraclass: Marsupialia
- Order: Dasyuromorphia
- Family: Dasyuridae
- Genus: Planigale
- Species: P. gilesi

Binomial name
- Planigale gilesi Aitken, 1972
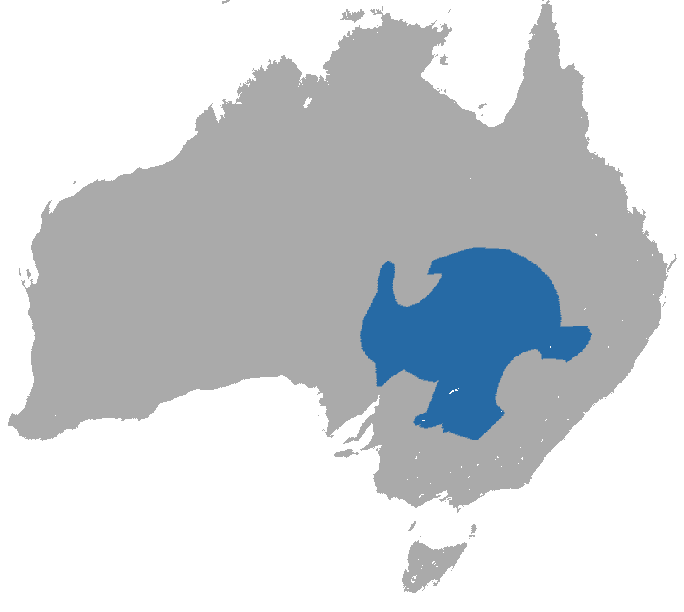
- Paucident planigale range

= Paucident planigale =

Species of marsupial

The paucident planigale (Planigale gilesi), also known as Giles' planigale, is a very small species of carnivorous marsupial of the family Dasyuridae.

== Taxonomy ==
The paucident planigale was not formally described until 1972, when it was named Planigale gilesi in honour of the explorer Ernest Giles, who explored Australia's deserts, including this species' habitat. It is one of seven members of the genus Planigale.

== Description ==
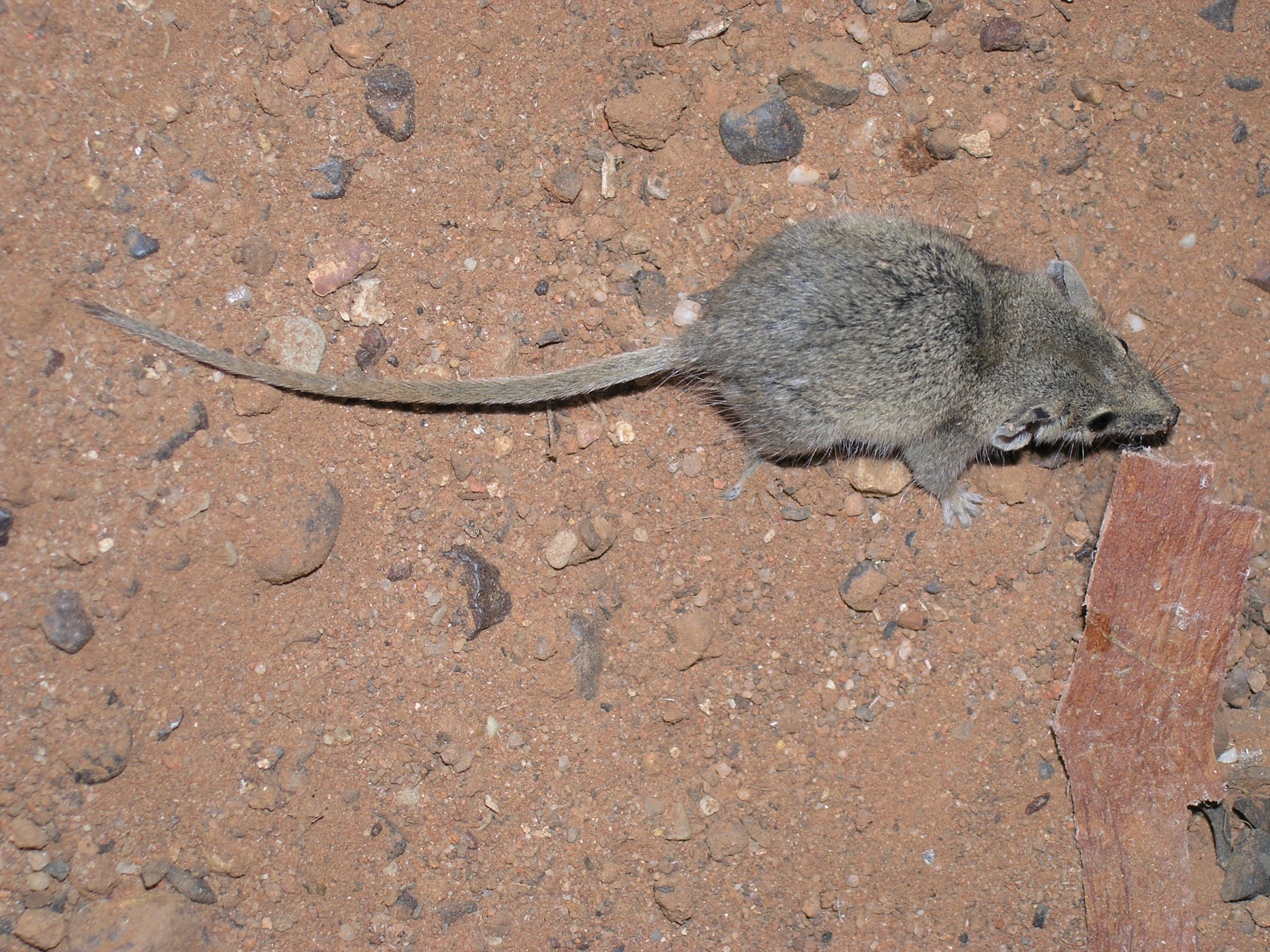
Paucident planigale

The paucident (from Latin pauci 'few', dentēs 'teeth') planigale differs from other planigales having only two premolars in each tooth row (all other planigales have three). The paucident planigale is recognised by its flattened triangular head and small rounded ears, is mid-grey to cinnamon in colour with a whitish underside. The paucident planigale weighs 6-15 grams, its body is 60mm-80mm long and its tail is 55-70mm long. It feeds on many small creatures, including beetles, locusts, spiders or other arthropods, and even occasionally feeds on small lizards or mammals. The paucident planigale kills small prey with quick bites. Although it is believed that fewer than twenty percent of individuals survive for more than two years, captive animals have reached five years of age.

== Reproduction ==
Paucident planigale breeding season is from July to mid-January, with most litters being born in September. Breeding season correlates with the spring and summer seasons, similar to other arid zone dasyurids when resources are at an increased supply.

The pouch of the female paucident planigale is flat and covered in dense, off white hairs approximately 5mm in length. There are 12 teats within the pouch which are smooth and cream in colour. The teats are slightly raised from the abdominal wall, 0.5mm in length, directed laterally. The pouch opening is 3.5mm long and 2mm wide. A thin skin fold covers the teats and is held firmly against the abdomen. The sub-adult, female paucident planigale experiences changes during its first breeding season when sexual maturity is reached at 5 months old. Hair is shed from the pouch exposing skin and the pouch rapidly develops musculature. Pouch development is completed before the birth of the first young, however, without pregnancy during the first oestrus, the development of the pouch is gradual and is slowly completed later in the breeding season.

For male paucident planigale spermatogenesis begins at sexual maturity at around 6.5 months old. Females make a soft "clucking" sound one night prior to oestrus, as the males court the females 24 hours prior to oestrus. Females respond to courting by fighting and vocalisation. Mating lasts between 2.5 – 4 hours and more than one male may mate with a female during that period. Fighting over oestrus females is common amongst males.

Female paucident planigale spend 3 days in oestrus and the oestrus cycle is 21 days. Gestation lasts for 15.5 days and the average litter size is 6. The young remain in the female's pouch attached to the teats for 37 days, although lactation lasts 75 days.

== Distribution and habitat ==
The paucident planigale is found in arid inland areas from Lake Eyre, South Australia, to Moree, New South Wales, and from Mildura, Victoria, to the southwestern Northern Territory. It is often found in areas with cracked clay soils, including floodplains and interdune areas among sandhills, the cracks providing shelter from adverse weather conditions.

== Behaviour ==
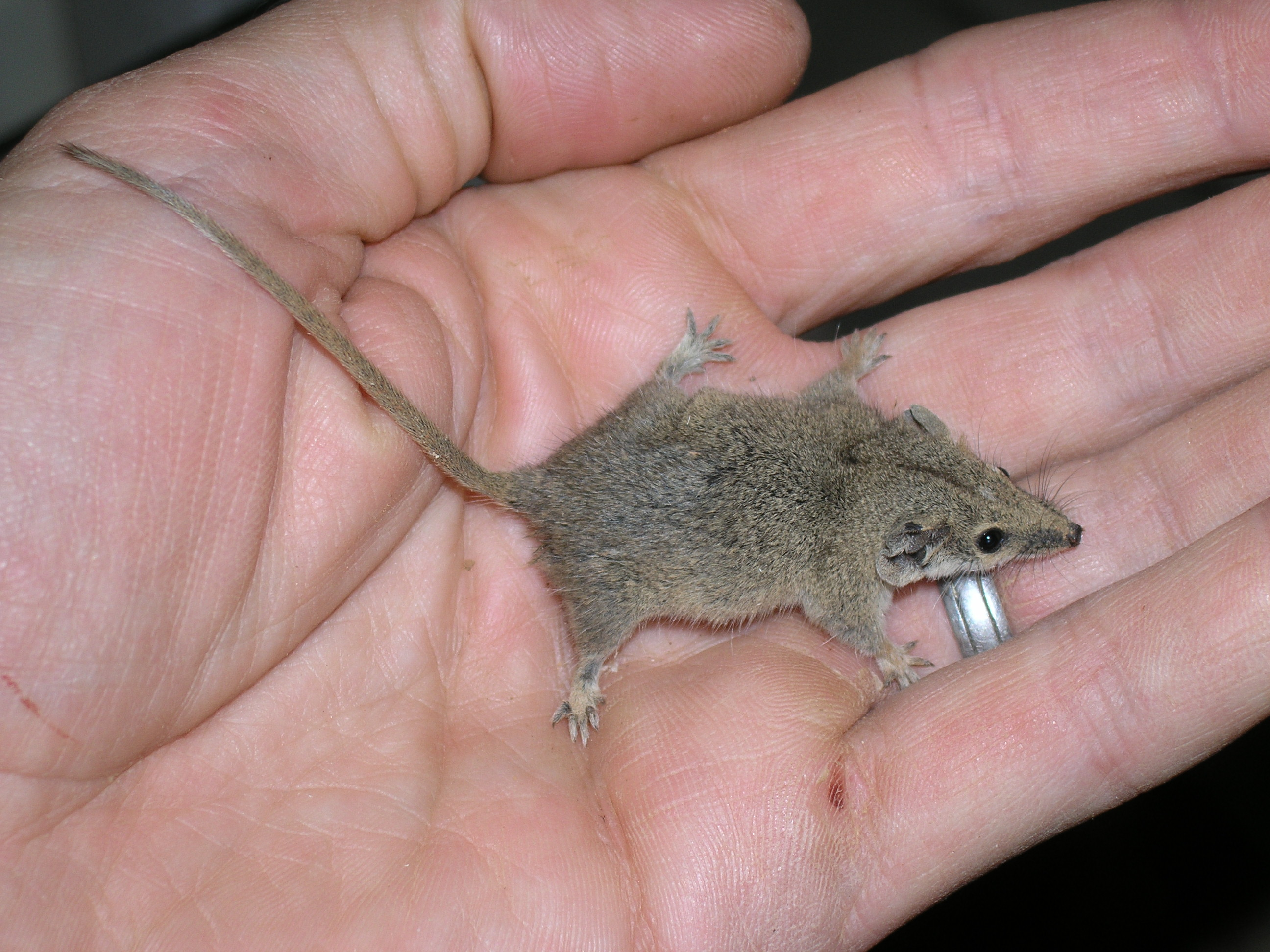
Paucident planigale

Paucident planigale is predominantly nocturnal and enters a state of torpor in unfavourable conditions to reduce energy expenditure in times of inactivity. The paucident planigale exhibits basking or sunning (behavior) as an energy-conserving strategy. The paucident planigale is the smallest mammal to display basking behavior in the wild in order to reduce energy requirements, particularly in winter. Basking assists with survival in harsh and unpredictable environments with limited food availability. The paucident planigale forages through low lying vegetation, soil crevices, and leaf litter for invertebrates and small vertebrates.

== Threats ==
The paucident planigale is hunted by introduced predators such as foxes and feral cats. Loss of habitat by frequent burning, reducing ground cover, disturbances to vegetation surrounding water bodies, and habitat degradation are all threatening factors for paucident planigale.

== Conservation status ==
The paucident planigale has been listed as threatened under the Flora and Fauna Guarantee Act 1988 in the state of Victoria, although it is not considered threatened nationally. In Victoria, the paucident planigale has restricted distribution and is limited to a narrow zone of floodplain along the Murray River.
