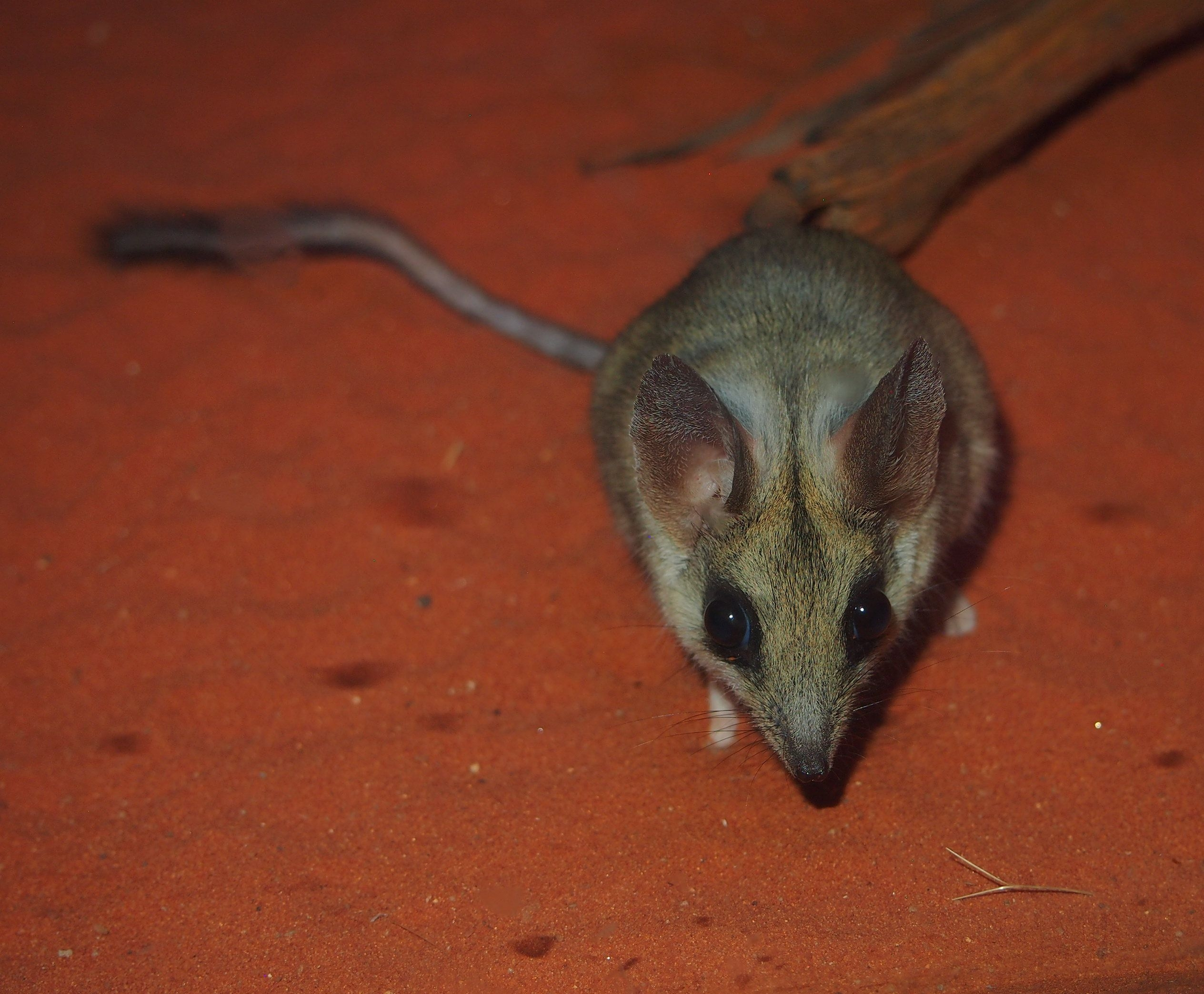

Conservation status
- Least Concern (IUCN 3.1)

Scientific classification
- Kingdom: Animalia
- Phylum: Chordata
- Class: Mammalia
- Infraclass: Marsupialia
- Order: Dasyuromorphia
- Family: Dasyuridae
- Subfamily: Sminthopsinae
- Tribe: Sminthopsini
- Genus: Antechinomys
- Species: A. laniger

Binomial name
- Antechinomys laniger (Gould, 1856)
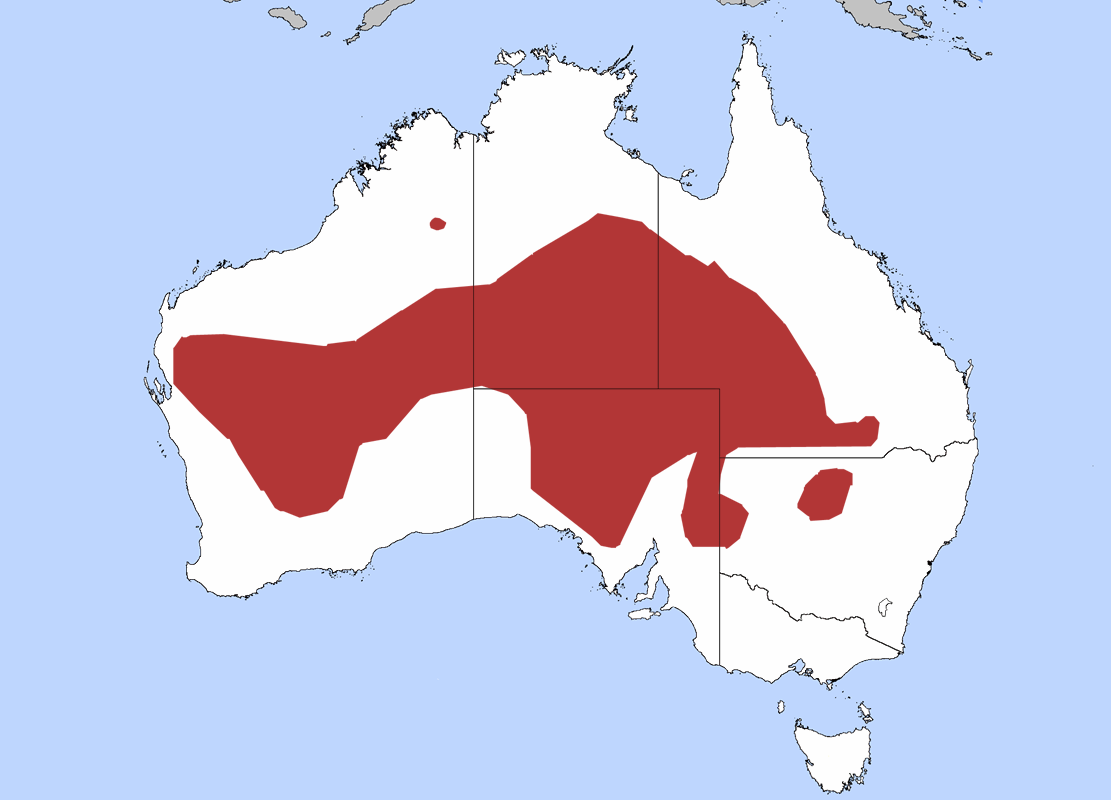
- Distribution of the kultarr (including A. spenceri in central Australia and A. auritus found across much of outback Western Australia, which have not been recognized as separated species until 2025)

= Kultarr =

Species of marsupial

The kultarr (Antechinomys laniger), also called the "jerboa-marsupial" or marsupial jerboa, is a small insectivorous nocturnal marsupial inhabiting the arid interior of Australia. Preferred habitat includes stony deserts, shrubland, woodland, grassland and open plains. The kultarr has a range of adaptations to help cope with Australia's harsh arid environment including torpor similar to hibernation that helps conserve energy. The species has declined across its former range since European settlement due to changes in land management practices and introduced predators.

== Description ==
The kultarr is a small carnivorous marsupial of the family Dasyuridae with unique morphological features. It is nocturnal, hunting a variety of invertebrates including spiders, crickets and cockroaches. During the day it shelters in a burrows in hollow logs, beneath grass tussocks, at the base of shrubs and trees or cracks in the soil. Males weigh between 17 and 30 grams and 80–100 mm in length. Females are slightly smaller between 14 and 29 grams and 70–95 mm in length. They have a brown or fawn-sandy color, with a white underside. The kultarr has a long tail with a distinctive dark brush-like tip. The muzzle is sharply pointed and the eyes and ears are particularly large; the eyes have dark rings around them. It has distinguishing elongated hind legs having four toes similar to macropodids. The hind legs are designed for a bipedal or hopping style movement, used to evade predators and catch prey such as insects. Kultarrs have been recorded moving at speeds of 13.8 km/h in open country.

== Taxonomy ==
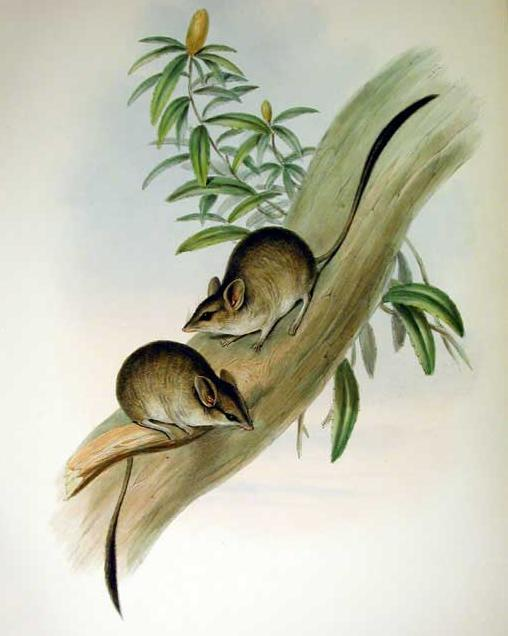
Original illustration of Antechinomys laniger by John Gould 1863

The kultarr is the sole member of the genus Antechinomys of the family Dasyuridae. Originally collected by Sir Thomas Mitchell in New South Wales, it was subsequently described as Phascogale lanigera by John Gould in 1856. It was then moved into its own genus, Antechinomys, by Gerard Krefft in 1867 and in 1888 the species was formally named Antechinomys laniger. In 1906 a second species of Antechinomys was described from specimens collected from an expedition to central Australia, classified as Antechinomys spenceri. Extensive discussion regarding the taxonomy of the genus followed. In 1981 it was proposed that Antechinomys was not distinct enough from Sminthopsis; subsequent isozyme and mitochondrial analysis proved the theory to be incorrect. A. laniger laniger and A. laniger spenceri are now accepted as being subspecies with minor morphological differences, both occurring in different geographic ranges. A. laniger laniger occurs in eastern Australia while A. laniger spenceri is found in western and central Australia. Morphological differences include A. laniger spenceri being paler in colour and heavier compared to A. laniger laniger.

A 2025 research studiy described two additional species: the gibber kultarr (A. laniger spenceri) from central Australia was recognised as a separate species (A. spenceri), and the newly-identified long-eared kultarr (A. auritus) was found to exist across much of outback Western Australia. The eastern kultarr (A. laniger) once inhabited most of semi-arid eastern Australia but is now restricted to a limited range in central New South Wales and south-central Queensland.

== Distribution ==
The kultarr occurs across a vast area of semi-arid and arid Australia but has since declined from parts of its former range and is now uncommon with populations suffering seasonal fluctuations. The kultarr has disappeared from Victoria and southern New South Wales at the Murray-Darling junction. Populations in south-east South Australia, Cedar Bay in north Queensland and western Queensland have also disappeared.

Populations in the Northern Territory and Western Australia appear to be stable. Kultarr populations around Cobar in western New South Wales continue to persist, being regionally important for conservation of the species. Recent sightings of kultarrs occurred in 2015 at Nombinnie Nature Reserve in Central Western NSW. These sightings are significant as the species has not been sighted in the area for over 20 years.

== Ecology and behaviour ==
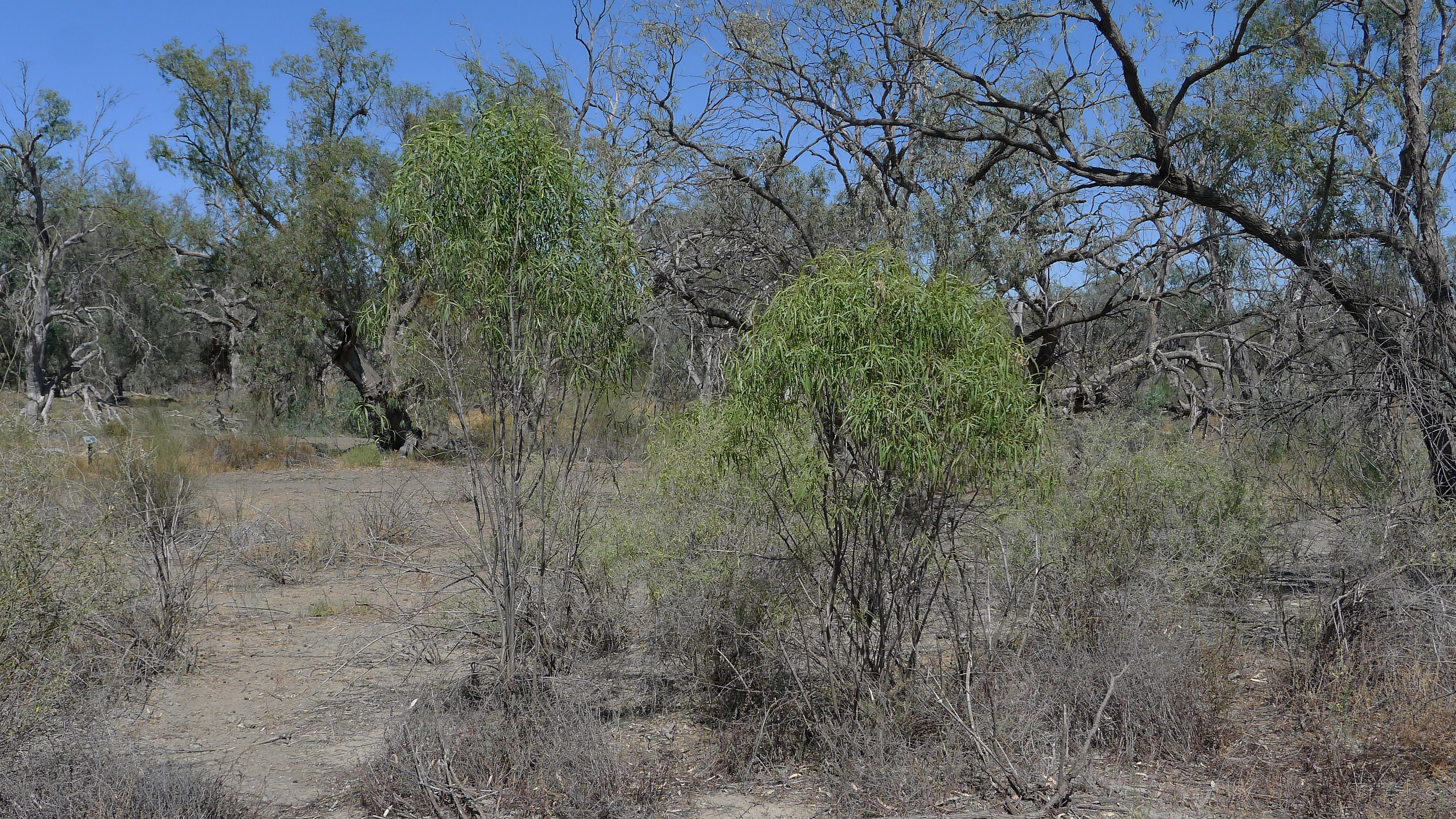
Semi-arid woodlands

=== Life cycle and reproduction ===
The lifespan of kultarrs in the wild is unknown however in captivity they can live up to 5 years. The kultarr has distinct geographical variations in breeding seasons. Breeding and the onset of estrus occurs in the second half of the year in eastern populations with western populations occurring slightly later. Males are sexually mature at 9–10 months and females at 11–12 months. Female are polyestrous, having the ability to enter estrus multiple times in a breeding season. The kultarr has a crescent shaped pouch consisting of small folds of skin with six to eight teats. The young are carried in the pouch for up to 20 days, after this they hold on to the mother's back whilst she forages or are left in the burrow.

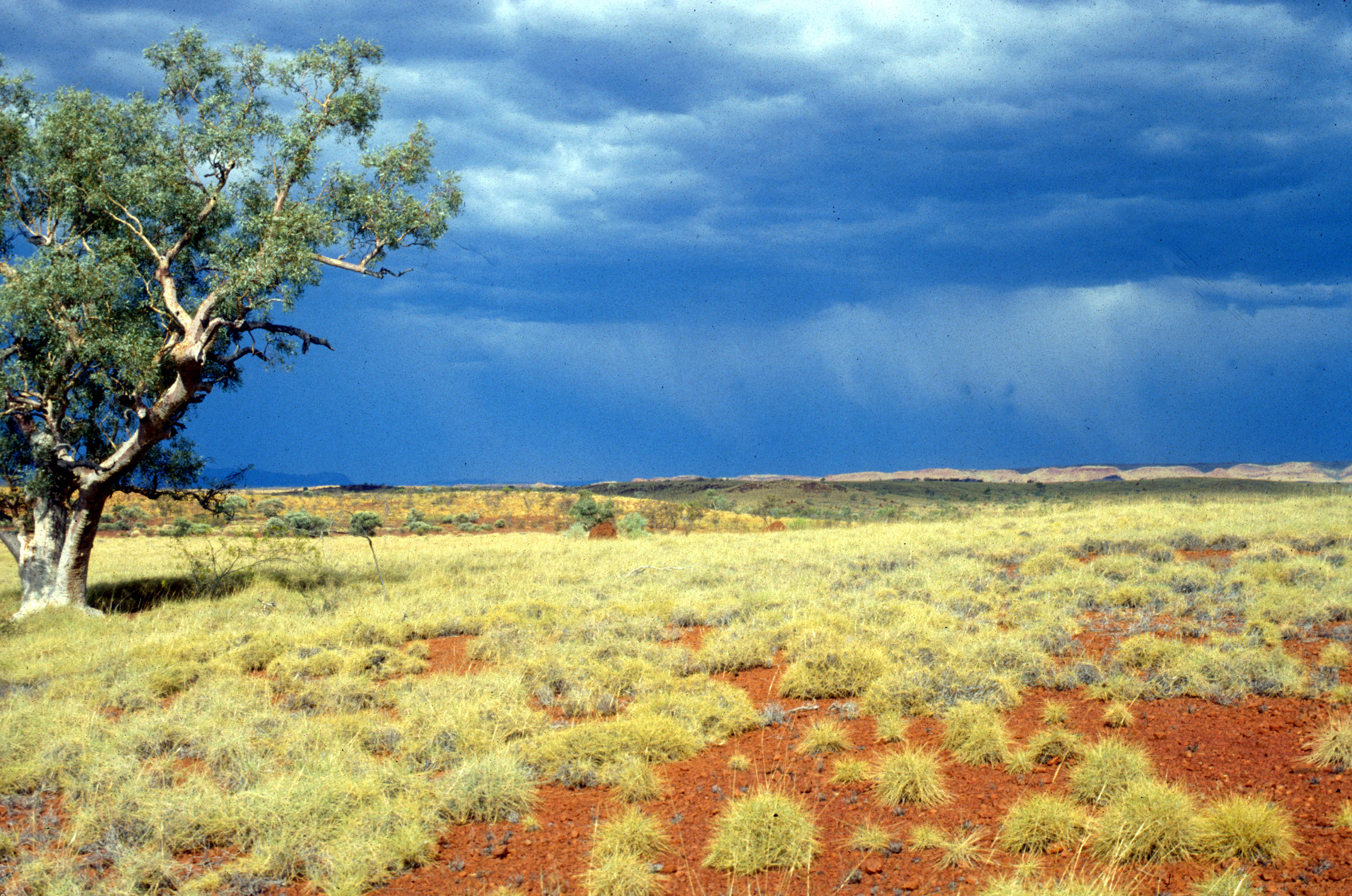
Hummock grassland

Both subspecies have different numbers of teats with A. laniger laniger having eight and A. laniger spenceri having six. This can be used to differentiate between the two subspecies. Captive breeding and rearing of kultarr is problematic and difficult.

=== Home range and movement ===
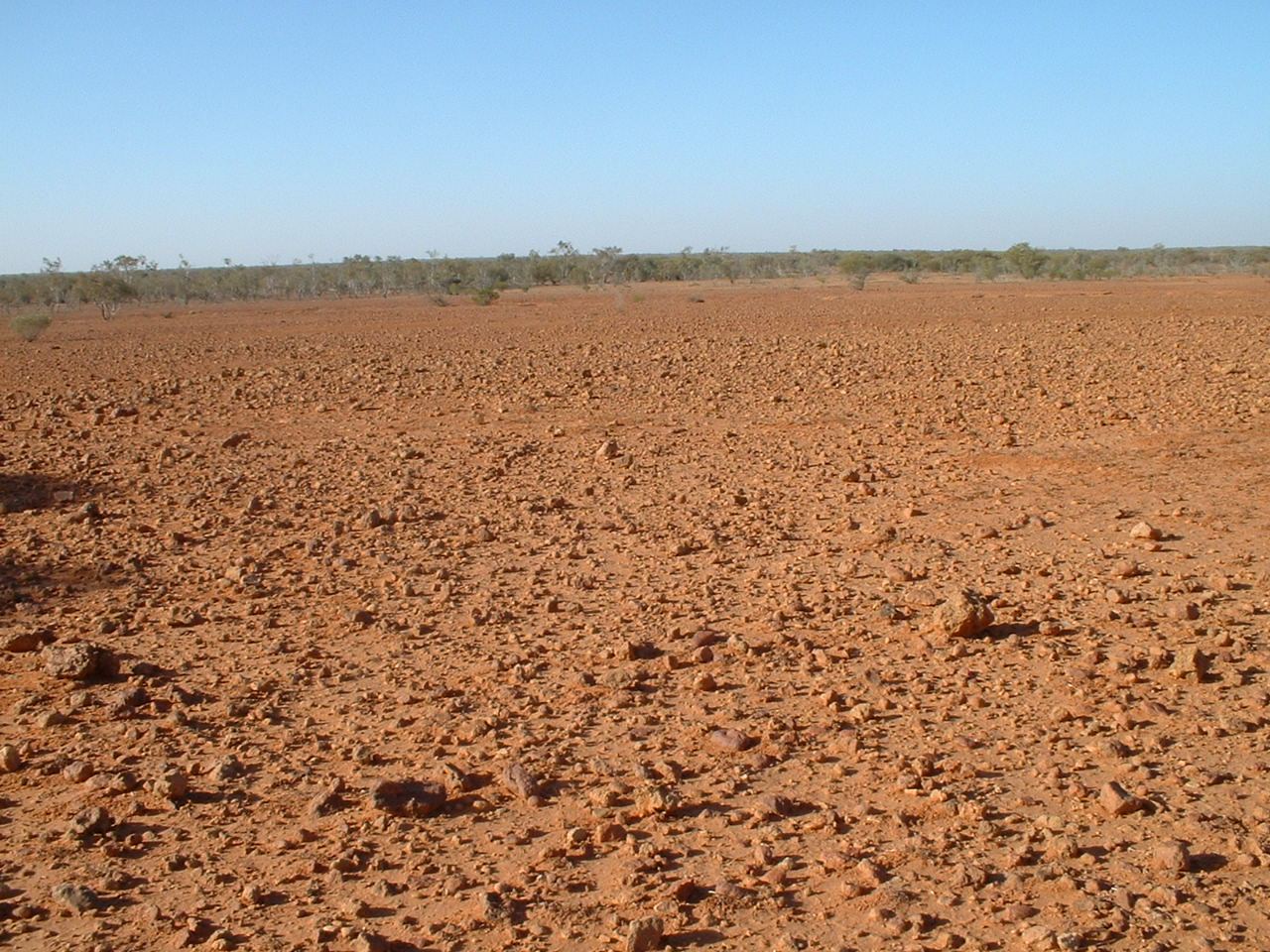
Gibber plains

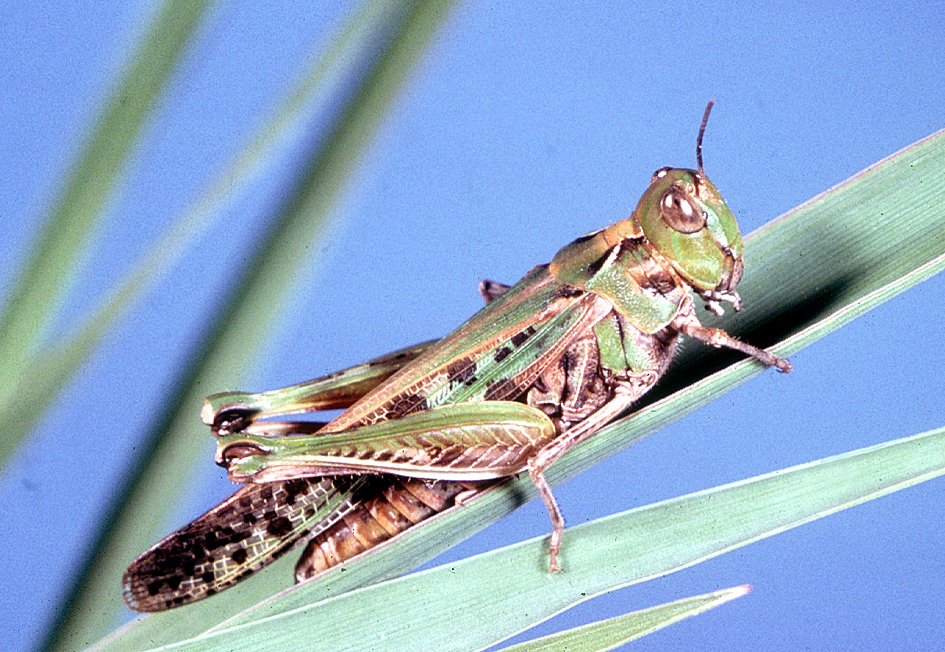
Australian plague locust Chortoicetes terminifera (CSIRO)

Kultarrs migrate between different locations throughout the year, meaning local populations numbers can vary depending on seasonal fluctuations. Populations can decline in response to good rain with kultarrs preferring drier seasons. Movements and home ranges of kultarrs vary with movements of up to 1,700 m per night for males and 400 m per night for females. Kultarrs disperse and negotiate a variety of different habitat types to forage from vegetated areas and open bare ground.

=== Diet ===
The kultarr is predominantly insectivorous, its diet consisting largely of species including spiders, cockroaches, crickets and beetles. Additionally, kultarrs are also known to prey on other species of dasyurids.

The digestive tract of the kultarr has been described, as have the digestibilities of captive feeding regimes, and the rates of passage of different dietary items through their digestive tracts.

=== Habitat ===
The kultarr occupies a range of different habitats preferring sparsely vegetated areas. Habitats include claypans, gibber plains, stony deserts, savannas, hummock (Triodia sp.) and tussock grasslands, woodlands and shrublands. Regional variation in habitat preference occurs with the western subspecies preferring stony, granite plains dominated by Acacia, Eremophila, and Cassia species. Eastern subspecies prefer sparsely vegetated clay pans in acacia woodlands.

=== Torpor as an adaptation ===
The kultarr is an endotherm having a high metabolic rate. To conserve energy, the kultarr enters into a state of torpor where the body temperature is reduced similar to hibernation. The body temperature drops to 11 °C, reducing the metabolic rate by 30%, conserving energy, and reducing water loss. Torpor occurs in the evening to early morning, lasting between 2–16 hours. Species that enter torpor are referred to as heterothermic endotherms. Other species of Dasyriuds in arid Australia use torpor and is an adaptation to combat limited resource availability. The benefits of torpor include having an extended lifetime; this is advantageous in the harsh arid environment enabling recovery of populations after stochastic weather events such as flooding or drought. Torpor is also used during the breeding season to ensure breeding success even during poor seasons. Other behaviours have been described in captivity.

== Threats to survival ==
=== Habitat degradation ===
Changes in land management practices since European settlement has resulted in catastrophic declines of terrestrial fauna species throughout arid Australia. Habitat degradation occurs through overgrazing by introduced species such as rabbits (Oryctolagus cuniculus), sheep (Ovis aries), and cattle (Bos taurus). Cattle can trample and destroy vegetation, damaging soil structure and reducing deep cracks that reduces nesting and shelter sites for the kultarr.

=== Predation by cats and foxes ===
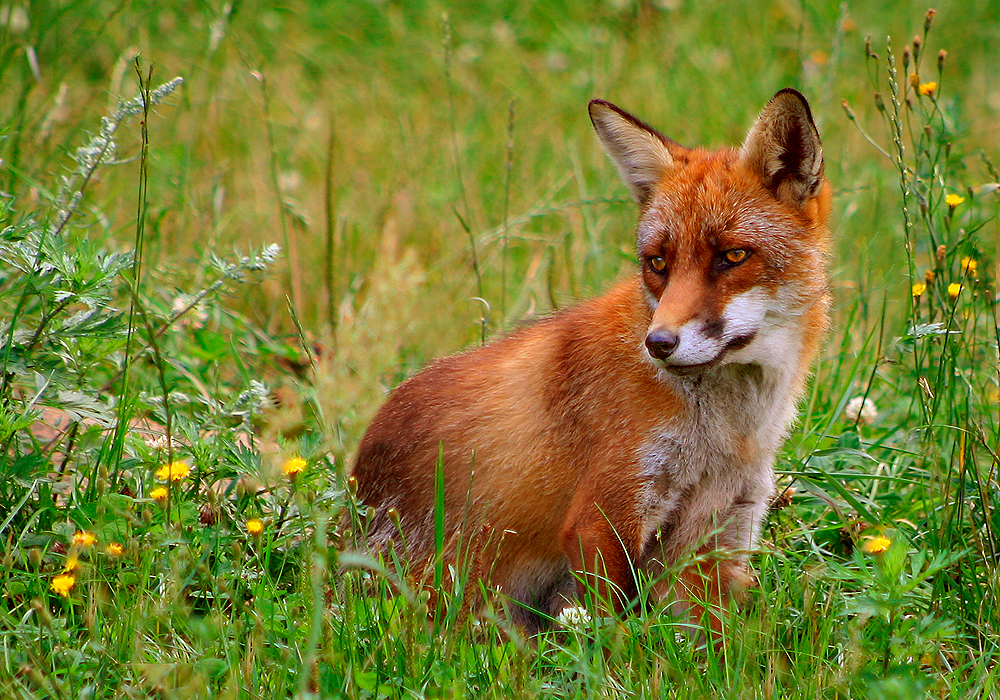
Fox (Vulpes vulpes)

Kultarrs are threatened by introduced predators such feral cats (Felis catus) and red foxes (Vulpes vulpes). Good rainfall results in ecosystem pulses in arid regions, allowing predators to increase their numbers, therefore predation on kultarrs increases. Kultarrs are also predated by native species such as native owls and snakes. However cats differ from native predators as they are recreational hunters and continue to prey on species even when prey numbers are low. Domesticated cats on cattle stations have also been reported as preying on kultarrs.

=== Flooding ===
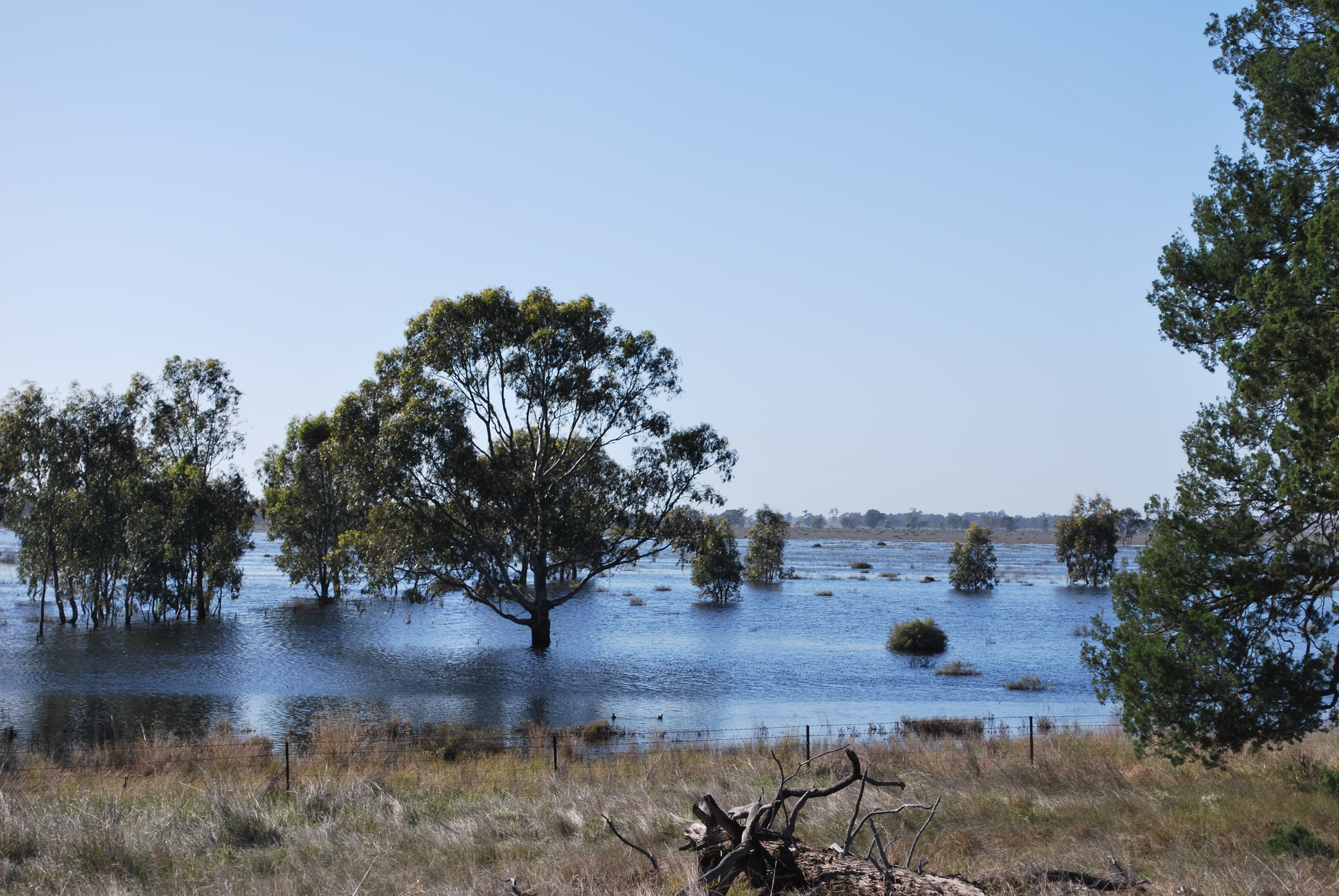
Floods

Populations of kultarrs experience significant decline due to the impacts of flooding, causing the mortality of individuals through drowning and flooding of burrows. The impact is exacerbated if kultarr populations are isolated, hindering re-colonisation. The destruction of kultarr habitat is also a consequence of severe flooding.

=== Fire ===
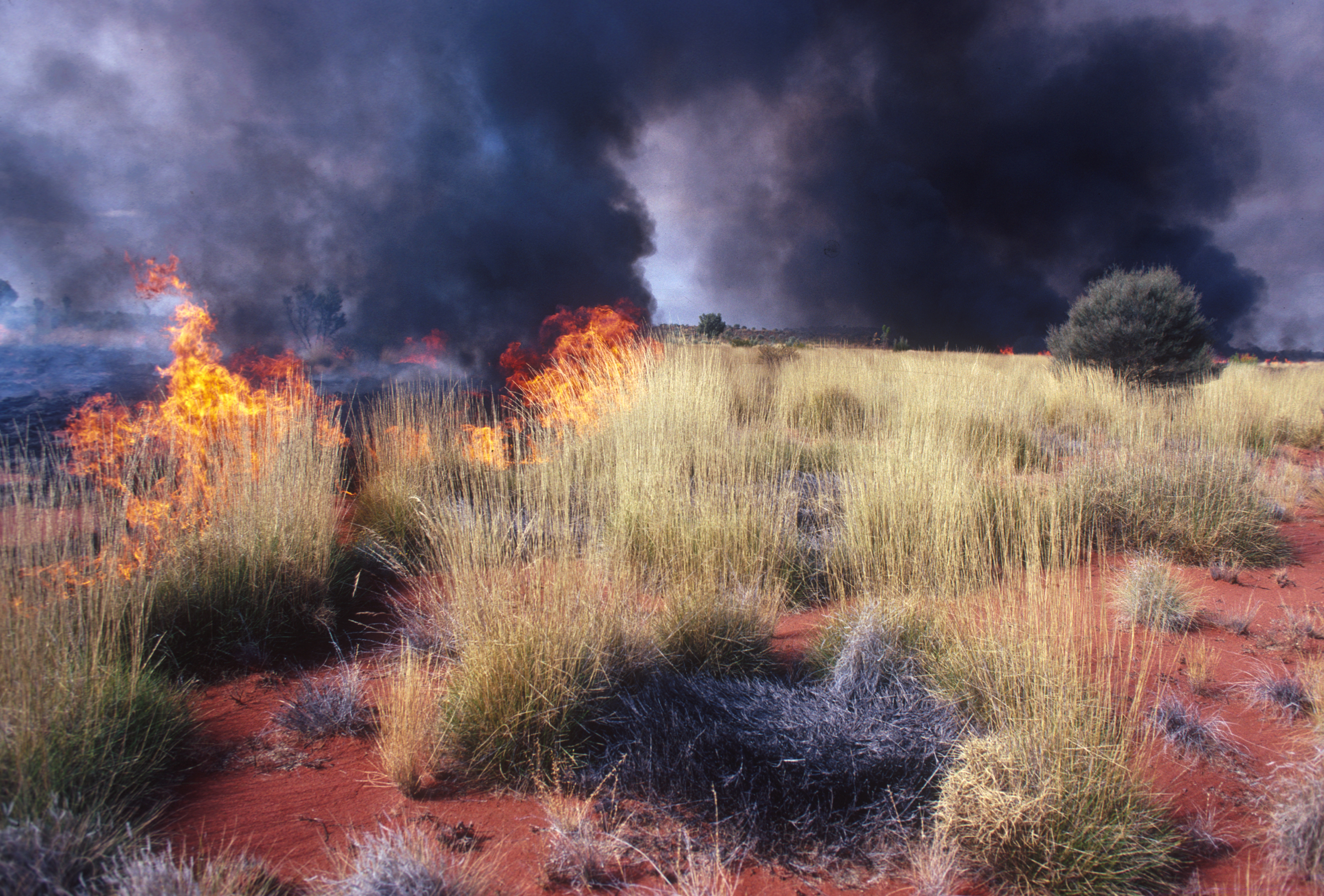
Wild fires (CSIRO)

The cessation of indigenous fire-stick farming and the reduction of patch-mosaic burning in arid Australia since European colonisation have caused increased severity of large-scale wildfires. Contributing to the decline of suitable habitat and refuges for the kultarr including tree hollows, fallen logs, Triodia spp. hummocks, shrubs and leaf litter.

=== Insecticides used to control locusts ===
Insecticide control of the Australian plague locust has been attributed to possible fatalities of species of Dasyriuds from secondary poisoning. Kultarrs are particularly susceptible because of their high insect diet, high metabolism and small body size. Once locusts are affected by insecticide kultarrs are able to capture and gorge-feed on them easily, making them susceptible to poisoning.

== Conservation and management ==
=== Current status ===
The kultarr is classified as endangered in New South Wales under the Threatened Species Conservation Act 1995 and near threatened in the Northern Territory under the Territory Parks and Wildlife Conservation Act 2000. In Queensland it is classified as least concern under the Nature Conservation Act 1992. The kultarr is not classified in South Australia, Victoria or Western Australia. The kultarr is not listed under the Environment Protection and Biodiversity Conservation Act 1999 and listed as least concern on the International Union for Conservation of Nature (IUCN) 'red list' of threatened species.

=== Targeted conservation programs ===
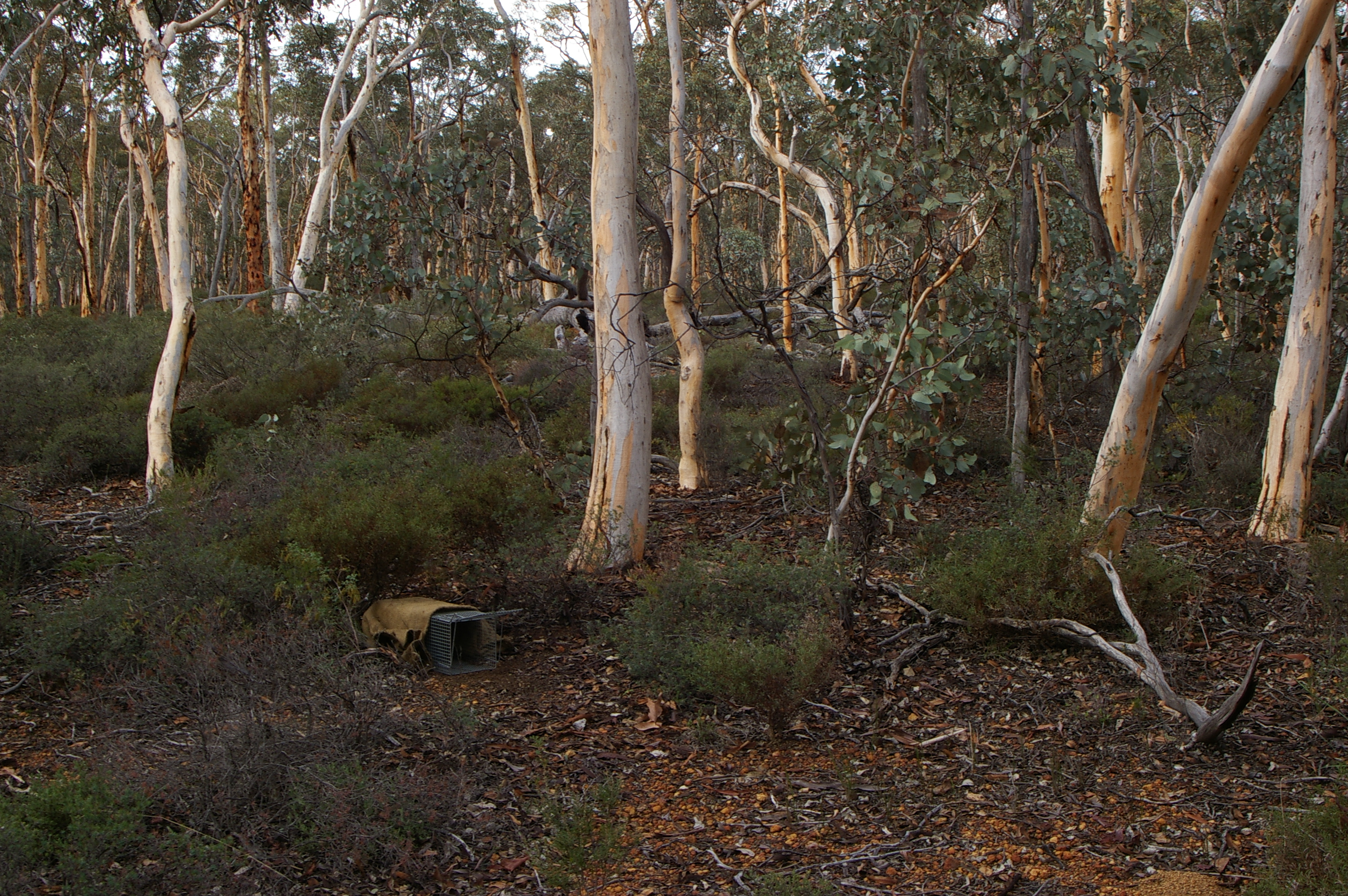
Fauna monitoring

The New South Wales National Parks and Wildlife Service developed a detailed recovery plan for the kultarr under the "saving our species" program. Objectives include identifying species distributions and habitat requirements, identifying specific threats to the species, implementing direct management strategies to reduce threats as well as public education to increase the profile of the kultarr. At present there are no plans to reintroduce kultarrs into the wild.

Direct management strategies that benefit the species include:

- Fox, rabbit and feral cat control programs
- Maintaining patch mosaic burning in the landscape
- Reducing the stocking rates of livestock on properties and excluding cattle from important kultarr habitat
- Retention of understory and groundcover plants as well as other elements such as logs and leaf litter
- Reporting any new sighting of the species.

== See also ==
- Hopping mouse, jerboa, jumping mouse, kangaroo mouse, kangaroo rat and springhare – rodents similar in body plan and locomotion, examples of convergence
