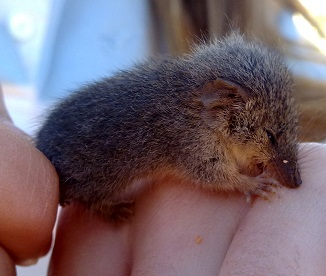
- Southern ningaui captured in the Middleback Ranges, South Australia, 2011

Conservation status
- Least Concern (IUCN 3.1)

Scientific classification
- Kingdom: Animalia
- Phylum: Chordata
- Class: Mammalia
- Infraclass: Marsupialia
- Order: Dasyuromorphia
- Family: Dasyuridae
- Genus: Ningaui
- Species: N. yvonneae

Binomial name
- Ningaui yvonneae Kitchener, Stoddart & Henry, 1983
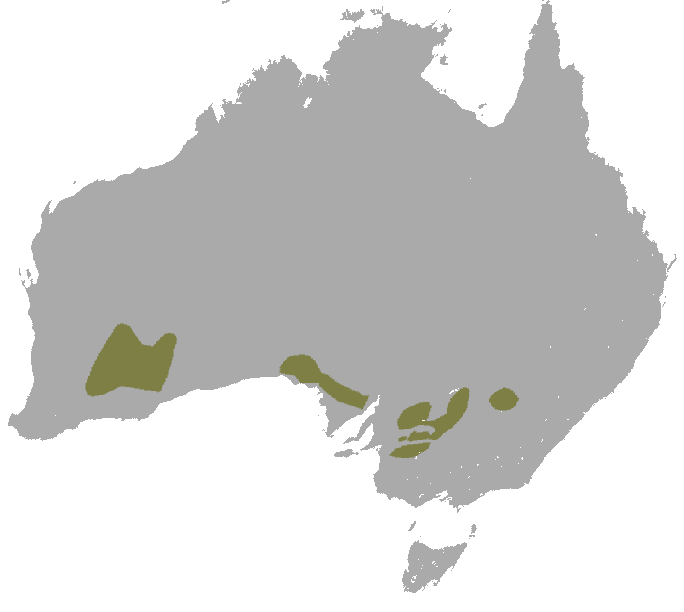
- Southern ningaui range

= Southern ningaui =

Species of marsupial

The southern ningaui (Ningaui yvonneae) is a tiny marsupial carnivore belonging to the Dasyuridae family. Similar in appearance to Ningaui ridei, found throughout central Australia, this species occurs in spinifex on semi-arid sandplains across the southern coast of the continent. The fur is a tawny or greyish olive colour, light grey below, and distinguished by shades of cinnamon. The southern ningaui prefers smaller prey, including insects and spiders, but is capable of killing and consuming larger animals such as cockroaches and skinks. Their narrow muzzle is used with quick and fierce bites about the head to despatch their meal. The species was first described in 1983, and placed within the genus Ningaui.

== Taxonomy ==
The first description of the species was published in 1983 in a revision of a genus describing two species. An analysis of skull morphology revealed a third species in the widely distributed populations, which is not evident in examination of external characters. The holotype was collected near Mt Manning in Western Australia.

The common names of the species include Kitchener's ningaui, southern ningaui and mallee ningaui.

== Description ==
A species of the carnivorous marsupials the southern ningaui is distinguishable from others of the genus by the tawny or greyish olive coloration of the pelage. The fur has a long and untidy appearance, with longer black guard hairs. The dark olive colour of the upperparts grades to pale grey at the ventral side. The narrow grey muzzle is whitish at lower part and over the face, the eyes are relatively small and close set. The ear measurement is 13 to 14 mm (0.51 to 0.55 in), small and barely protruding above the hairline, a patch of cinnamon fur is found below the ear. A slight cinnamon colour is also found in partial ring below and behind the eyes. The combined head and body length is 54 to 74 mm (2.1 to 2.9 in), with a similar length to the tail of 57 to 70 mm (2.2 to 2.8 in).

Thee female always has seven teats, whereas the species Ningaui ridei that overlaps its range possesses six to eight teats. They weigh 5–10 g (0.18–0.35 oz).

== Behaviour ==
The species diet consists of a range of invertebrates and smaller reptiles such as skinks. The southern ningaui shows a preference for smaller prey when presented with an alternative, with a higher net gain for the energy expended in consuming animals such as cockroaches, and opportunistic in their selection of Hymenoptera, Araneae and Coleoptera species. They are able to climb through dense spinifex and thin branches in search of prey, assisted by a partially prehensile tail, or forage around the vegetation on the ground. They reside during the day in the clumps of spinifex, species of the low, spiny and dense Triodia plants that dominate as hummocks, sometimes in association with other dense vegetation in semiarid mallee scrubland or heaths over sandy plains or dunes.

== Distribution and habitat ==
The southern ningaui is found across semi-arid regions of southern Australia, always in vegetation associated with Triodia. They are known to occur at the Lake Cronin region, in South Australia, and Victoria (the Big Desert, Sunset Country and Annuello) and toward the east of the continent at Round Hill in New South Wales. The wide distribution range includes isolated populations, only common in a local area, or is rare or absent in other locations. Attempts to survey the local populations only succeed in the capture of small numbers of the animal, excepting a few locations and a large population at a site in the Middleback Ranges on the Eyre peninsula.

A study of habitat preference suggested a close relationship with vegetation associated with Triodia irritans, which provides refuge from predators. A study of the home range of individuals indicates they occupy large areas relative to the animal's size, and may be localised or drift over a period of months. Females show greater fidelity to a location, being recaptured within 70 metres (230 ft) in the short term and over 200 metres (660 ft) at intervals greater than 100 days. Males are more mobile, with recaptures up to 600 metres in the short term and ranging more widely over monthly intervals; they are more transitory in the breeding season.

== Reproduction ==
The southern ningaui lives for approximately 14 months. The females are seasonally polyoestrous and the breeding season lasts from September to early February. Only one litter is produced per season which, as the life span is so short, means the female ningaui only produces one litter in her lifetime. Generally there is only a single cohort present, aside from just after the breeding season when the juveniles are present but the previous cohort has not yet died off.

== Conservation ==
The conservation status of Ningaui yvonneae was classified in 2015 as least concern in the IUCN Red List, with a population presumed to be stable. The population in New South Wales is listed as vulnerable to extinction, and in Victoria as near threatened.
