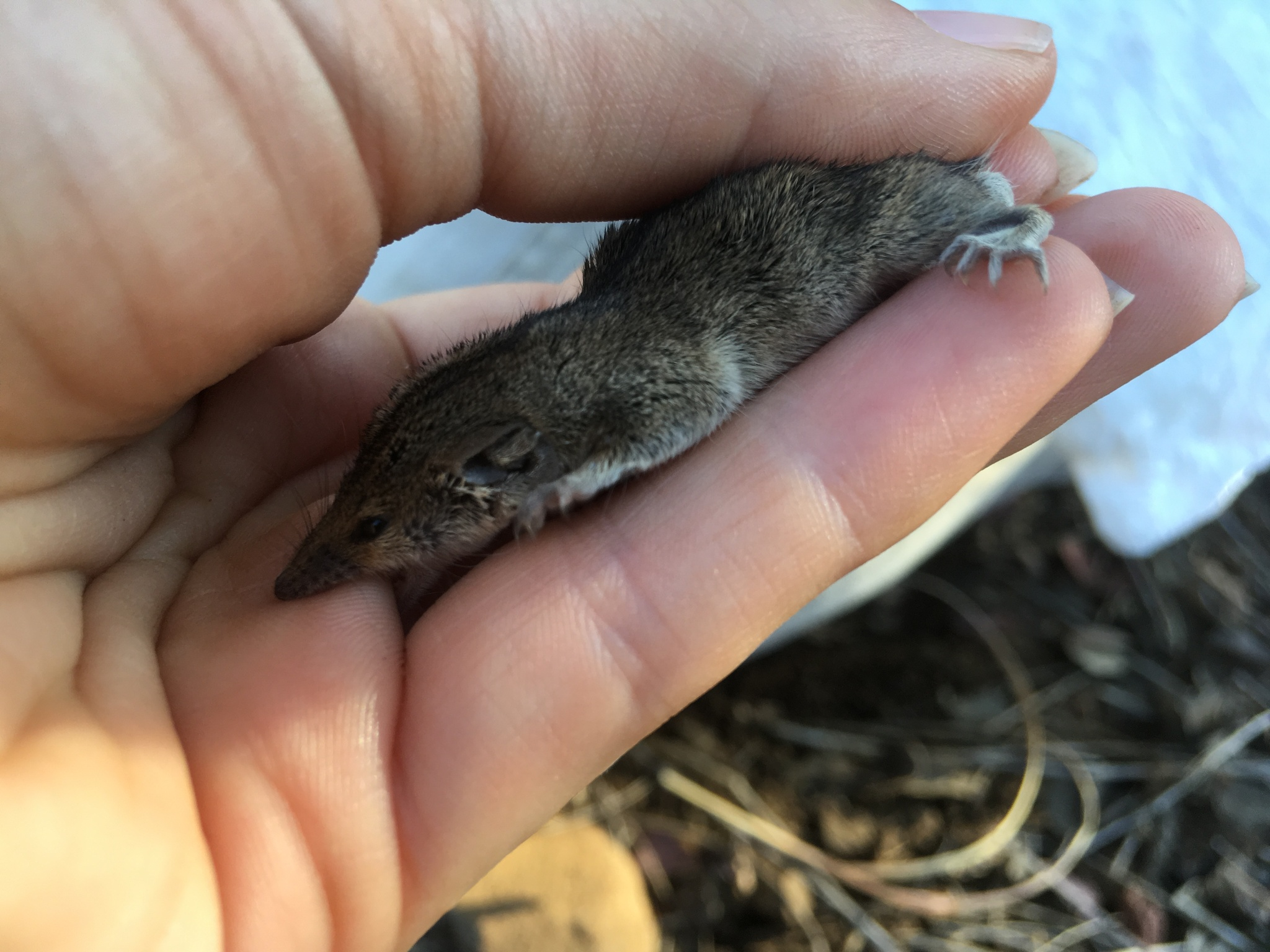
- A long-tailed planigale biting a human hand

Conservation status
- Least Concern (IUCN 3.1)

Scientific classification
- Kingdom: Animalia
- Phylum: Chordata
- Class: Mammalia
- Infraclass: Marsupialia
- Order: Dasyuromorphia
- Family: Dasyuridae
- Genus: Planigale
- Species: P. ingrami

Binomial name
- Planigale ingrami (Thomas, 1906)
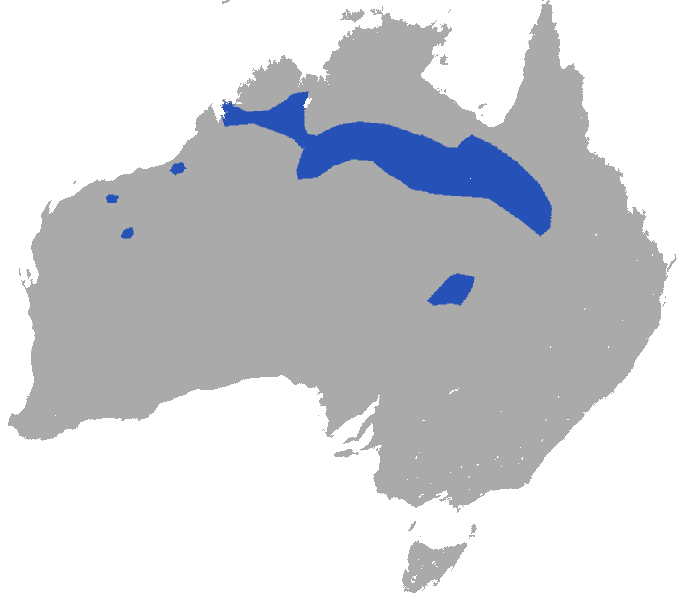
- Long-tailed planigale range

= Long-tailed planigale =

Species of marsupial

The long-tailed planigale (Planigale ingrami), also known as Ingram's planigale or the northern planigale, is the smallest of all marsupials, and one of the smallest of all mammals. It is rarely seen but is a quite common inhabitant of the blacksoil plains, clay-soiled woodlands, and seasonally flooded grasslands of Australia's Top End.

== Taxonomy ==
The long-tailed planigale was described in 1906 by Oldfield Thomas, who placed it in the genus Phascogale. The species was moved in 1928 by Ellis Le Geyt Troughton, who created the genus Planigale for it and the other then-known species, the common planigale (P. maculata), and described the narrow-nosed planigale (P. tenuirostris). The species has since suffered some taxonomic confusion, having been referred to as Planigale subtilissima; there has also been some confusion concerning subspecies. Currently, three subspecies are recognised:

- P. i. ingrami, found in the Northern Territory to Townsville, Queensland;
- P. i. brunnea, found in the Richmond area of Queensland;
- P. i. subtilissima, found in the Ord Victoria Plain and the Kimberley region of Western Australia.

== Description ==
The long-tailed planigale has an extraordinary head shape. All planigales have a flattened head, much broader than it is deep. This smallest planigale takes skull depth to an extreme: at just 3 to 4 mm (0.12 to 0.16 in) from top to bottom, the skull is one-fifth as deep as it is wide. The purpose, it seems, is to allow it to squeeze into the tiniest of soil cracks; to find its prey, perhaps to avoid predators, or more probably for both reasons. The clays and blacksoils of the Top End typically develop deep cracks as they dry after the monsoonal summer rains, which persist right through the eight-month dry season until the wet begins again, usually producing floods that force small creatures like the long-tailed planigale to seek refuge on high ground.

The head shape aside (which in any case is not obvious from all angles), the long-tailed planigale looks rather like a very small mouse with a long, bare tail. The muzzle is pointed, the fur a nondescript and variable brown, the hindlegs a little bigger than the forelegs, allowing it to stand semi-crouched on hindlegs and tail, rather like a tiny squirrel.

Combined head-body length varies from 55 to 65 mm (2.2 to 2.6 in), averaging 59 mm (2.3 in) in both sexes; the tail length is similar. Average male weight is 4.2 g (0.15 oz), 4.3 g (0.15 oz) for females; a really large specimen can reach almost 6 g (0.21 oz).

== Diet ==
Like all members of the Dasyuromorphia, it is carnivorous, living on invertebrates and small vertebrates which they catch by energetic nocturnal hunting through leaf litter and in soil cracks.

By night it is an active and fearless hunter, preying mostly on insects and their larvae, small lizards, and young mammals almost as large as itself. With the larger prey like grasshoppers, an initial pounce is often insufficient and the planigale bites repeatedly until its prey no longer struggles. Usually, it eats only the soft parts, discarding the head and wings.

== Reproduction ==
Breeding can take place at any time of year, but mostly during the wet season. Four to eight young are born, sometimes as many as 12 in southern populations; the young spend six weeks in the backward-facing pouch, and then about another six weeks hidden in a grassy nest under bark or other vegetation while the mother forages each night.

== Distribution and habitat ==
The long-tailed planigale prefers floodplains and savannah woodlands with cracked clay soils, as well as riparian areas and blacksoil plains. It is found across northern Australia from the Pilbara through the Great Sandy Desert and the Kimberley region in Western Australia to the Barkly Tableland in the Northern Territory and Townsville in Queensland.

== See also ==
- Smallest organisms
