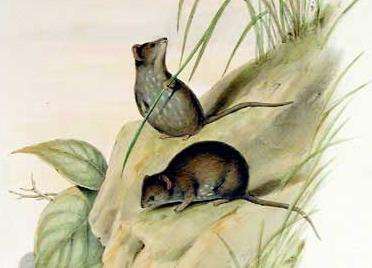

Conservation status
- Least Concern (IUCN 3.1)

Scientific classification
- Kingdom: Animalia
- Phylum: Chordata
- Class: Mammalia
- Infraclass: Marsupialia
- Order: Dasyuromorphia
- Family: Dasyuridae
- Genus: Planigale
- Species: P. maculata

Binomial name
- Planigale maculata (Gould, 1851)
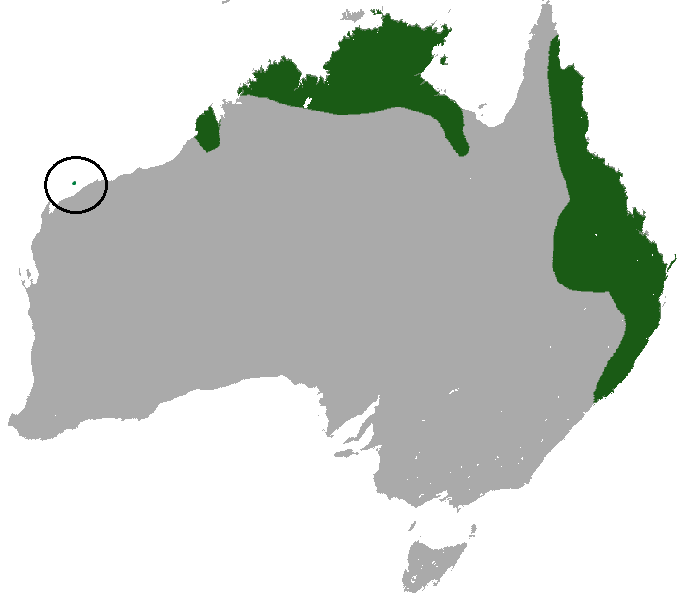
- Common planigale range

= Common planigale =

Species of mammal

The common planigale (Planigale maculata), also known as the pygmy planigale or coastal planigale, is one of the small carnivorous marsupials known as "marsupial mice" found in Australia. There they fill a similar niche to the insectivores of other parts of the world.

The common planigale was first described by John Gould in 1851, using a specimen forwarded to England by the collector Frederick Strange. It was originally described as Antechinus maculatus, and it was retained in the genus Antechinus until Mike Archer transferred it to Planigale in his 1976 revision of the latter genus. The species' scientific name means "spotted flat-weasel".

Two subspecies are recognised:

- P. m. maculata, found on mainland Australia;
- P. m. sinualis, found on Groote Eylandt.

== Physical description ==
As a "marsupial mouse," the common planigale lies somewhere between a mouse and a shrew in shape. Its body is covered in fur, though that of the tail is sparse when compared to the rest of the body. The underside of its coat is a light grayish yellow color, while the rest varies by individual from gray to a cinnamon color. This species is the largest of the genus, with a body and head length of about 100 mm (3.9 in) and a tail length of about 80 mm (3.1 in). Typical weights are close to 15 g (0.53 oz) for males and close to 11 g (0.39 oz) for females. The head of the common planigale is very narrow, giving it a flattened appearance, though less so than other planigales. Females have a well-developed pouch that opens toward the rear.

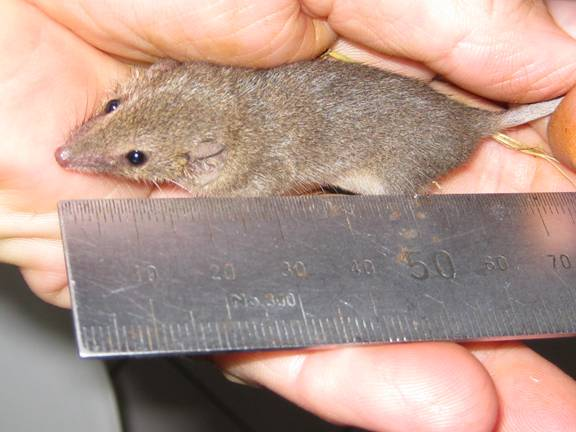

== Reproduction ==
The gestation for common planigale is 20 days. At the end of that period, the female gives birth to 5-11 young; the number varies but tends to be consistent with the number of teats the female possesses. They are born at an early stage in development and migrate to the pouch, where they suckle until they are fully developed. Young fully emerge from the pouch around 28 days of age, begin eating solid food at around 55, and are independent of the mother at 70. Breeding begins at around 290 days, later than many similar species. Males continue breeding until at least 24 months of age. Females are polyestrous and can raise several litters a year; in captivity, breeding takes place year-round.

== Behaviour ==
The common planigale makes its living on the ground where thick cover is present to protect it from predators. Its flattened skull allows it to slip through narrow crevasses, holes, and stands of grass to escape quickly or hunt for its prey. Community nests are often built. In captivity, females make small, saucer-shaped nests out of bark and grass; it is assumed that they do the same in the wild. The species is primarily nocturnal, though in the winter it will come out to forage for food in the daylight if conditions are favourable. If conditions are unfavourable, individuals may enter a state of torpor. In this state, metabolism is suppressed, decreasing oxygen use and lowering the respiration rate from 100/min to 15-30/min. Most species only enter torpor when food is scarce, but the common planigale has been observed to do so even when food is abundant, so air temperature may be the primary factor. While in this state, individuals curl up on their sides and tuck their heads into their stomach.

== Diet ==
The common planigale, like other members of the genus Planigale, eats primarily insects and other arthropods, though they may occasionally prey on other small animals, such as lizards or birds. Due to its small size, the common planigale tends to prefer smaller insects, typically those that are less than 15 mm (0.59 in) in length. However, it is capable of taking larger prey, such as large beetles and especially grasshoppers. To kill an insect, it bites the prey's underside, where the exoskeleton is softer. In captivity, the species is known to eat mealworms, commercial dog food, eggs, honey, and minced meat.

== Distribution and habitat ==
The common planigale is found from the upper Hunter River valley not far north of Sydney along the coast and hinterland to Cape York, and across the Top End of Australia to the Kimberley and a little beyond. It is also found on Groote Eylandt and on Great Keppel Island where its survival is threatened by proposed development. It occupies a wider range of habitat than other planigales, living in sclerophyll forest, rainforest, marshlands, grasslands and even the outer suburbs of Brisbane where it is occasionally trapped mistakenly as a house mouse. Throughout these habitats, it prefers areas with thick cover near water.

== Conservation status ==
The exact population of the common planigale is not known, but the species is not believed to be threatened and is not listed as such.
