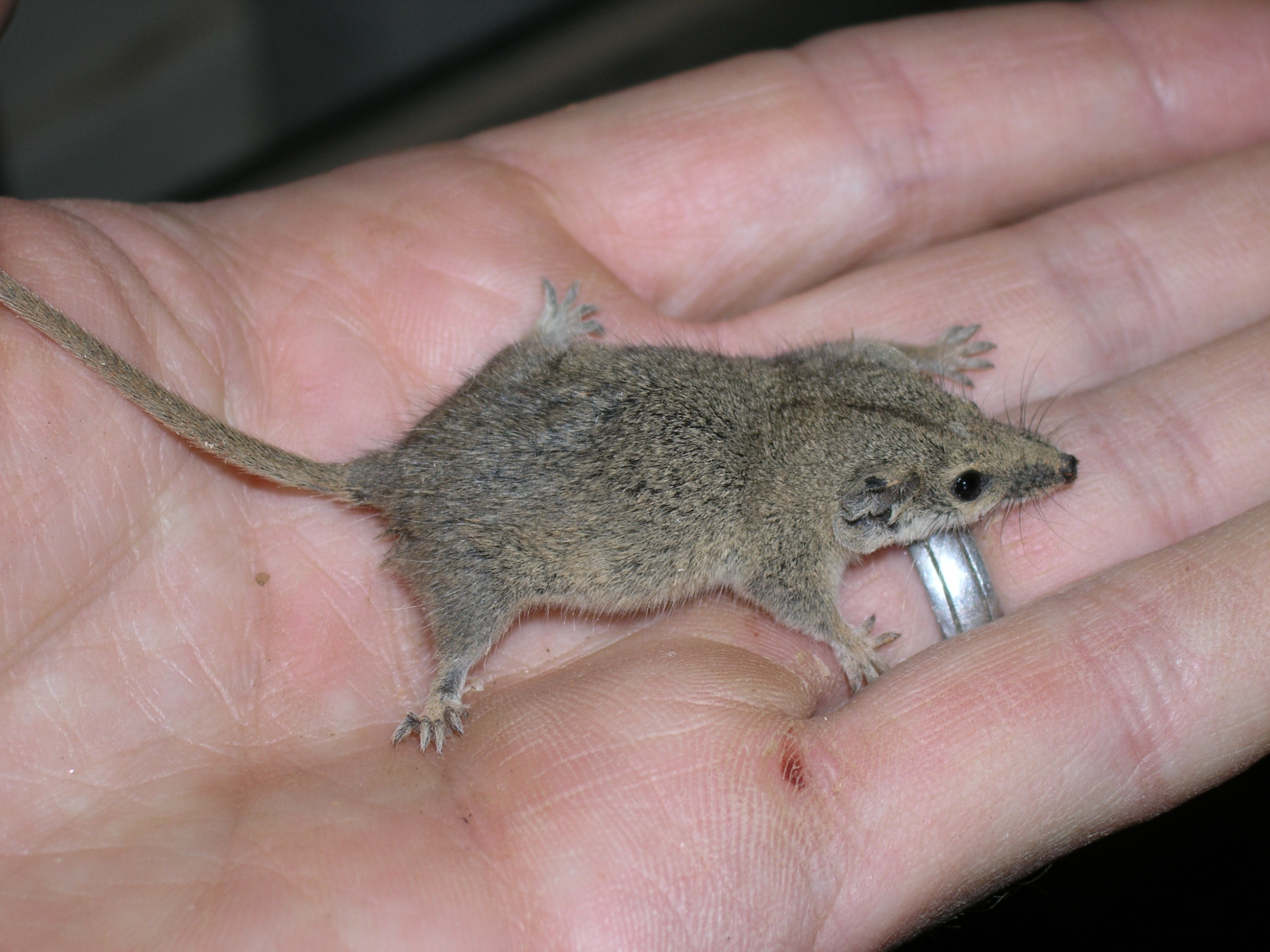
- Paucident planigale

Scientific classification
- Kingdom: Animalia
- Phylum: Chordata
- Class: Mammalia
- Infraclass: Marsupialia
- Order: Dasyuromorphia
- Family: Dasyuridae
- Subfamily: Sminthopsinae
- Tribe: Planigalini; Archer, 1982
- Genus: Planigale; Troughton, 1928

Type species
- Planigale brunneus Troughton, 1928 (= Phascogale ingrami Thomas, 1906)

Species
- P. gilesi; P. ingrami; P. kendricki; P. maculata; P. novaeguineae; P. tealei; P. tenuirostris

= Planigale =

Planigales

Genus of marsupials

The genus Planigale are small carnivorous marsupials found in Australia and New Guinea. It is the only genus in the tribe Planigalini of the subfamily Sminthopsinae. The genus has long been known to contain several cryptic species. Of the five Planigale species currently recognized, two (P. ingrami and P. maculata) are known species complexes.

The 9 species currently recognized, including 8 in Australia and 1 in New Guinea, are:

- Paucident planigale, Planigale gilesi
- Long-tailed planigale, Planigale ingrami
- Orange-headed Pilbara planigale, Planigale kendricki
- Common planigale, Planigale maculata
- New Guinean planigale, Planigale novaeguineae
- Cracking-clay Pilbara planigale, Planigale tealei
- Narrow-nosed planigale, Planigale tenuirostris
- Kimberley planigale, Planigale subtilissima
- Arnhem Plateau planigale, Planigale petrophila

== Species identification ==
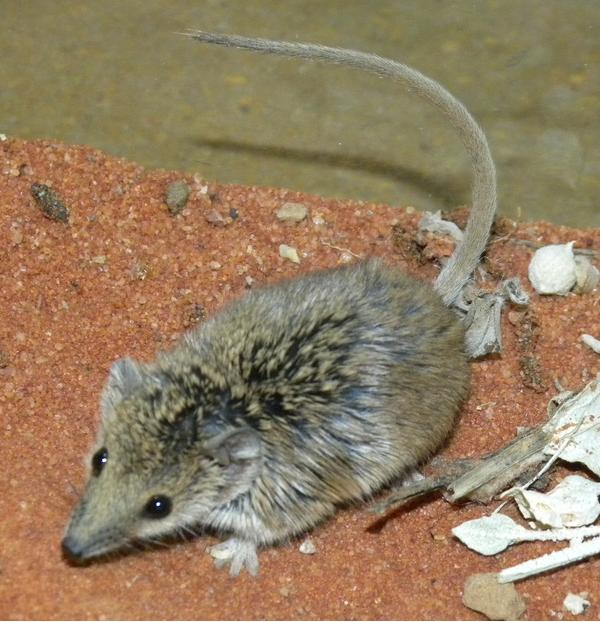
Planigale in a terrarium

Planigales are the smallest of all marsupials, some members of this carnivorous group weighing less than 5 grams. Being small, nocturnal and secretive, they are rarely seen; however, they are generally common in many parts of the arid interior of Western Australia. Their small size and cryptic nature make the various species difficult to tell apart, with head length and shape, body weight, footpad shape and granulation, fur colour, location, and habitat all being important aids to live identification. The Western Australian Museum has taken a series of footpad photos to aid in identification of Planigale species.
