= Angas Downs Indigenous Protected Area =

Protected area in the Northern Territory, Australia

- IUCN category VI (protected area with sustainable use of natural resources)
- Location within Northern Territory
- Location: Northern Territory, Petermann
- Nearest city: Imanpa
- Coordinates: 25°02′S 132°16′E
- Area: 3,205 km^{2} (1,237 sq mi)
- Established: 10 June 2009
- Governing body: Lisanote Pty Ltd
- Website: https://www.niaa.gov.au/indigenous-affairs/environment/angas-downs-ipa

Angas Downs Indigenous Protected Area (IPA) is an Aboriginal Australian-owned 320,500-hectare (1,237 sq mi) pastoral lease, within the MacDonnell Shire area, 300 kilometres (190 mi) south-west of Alice Springs, Northern Territory, 135 kilometres (84 mi) east from Uluṟu-Kata Tjuṯa National Park (Ayers Rock), 100 kilometres (62 mi) south-east of Kings Canyon/Watarrka National Park and 40 kilometres (25 mi) from Mount Ebenezer Roadhouse on the Lasseter Highway. The property is a pastoral lease held by the Imanpa Development Association.

It was declared and formally recognised as an Indigenous Protected Area as part of the Australian Government's Caring for Country scheme on 10 June 2009. The property forms part of Australia's National Reserve System.

Previous land management practices and other anthropogenic pressures had damaged Angas Downs, and many native species have disappeared. Preferred game and important animals are less common and feral animals and weeds pose a major challenge.

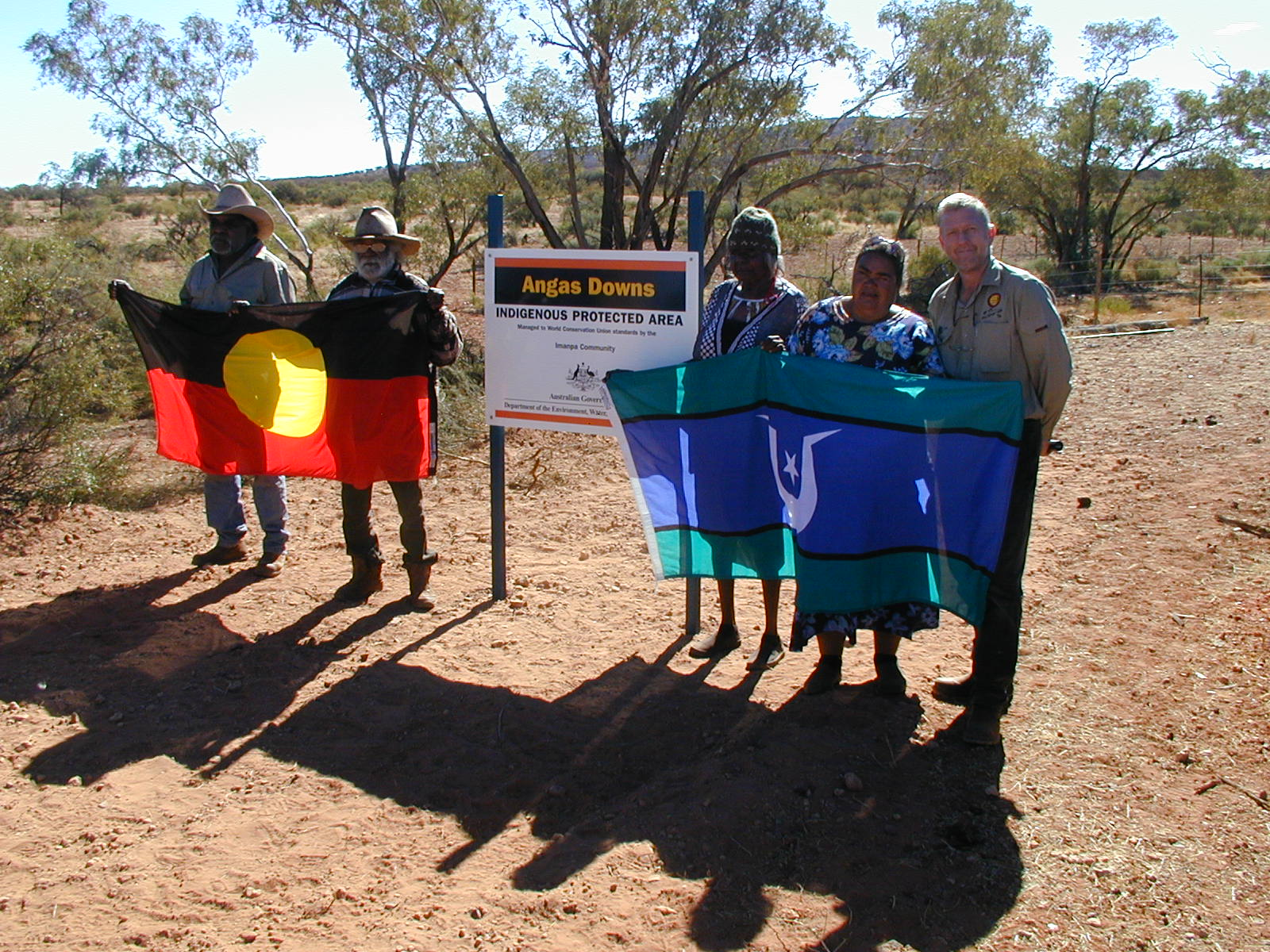
Angas Downs declaration, 10 June 2009

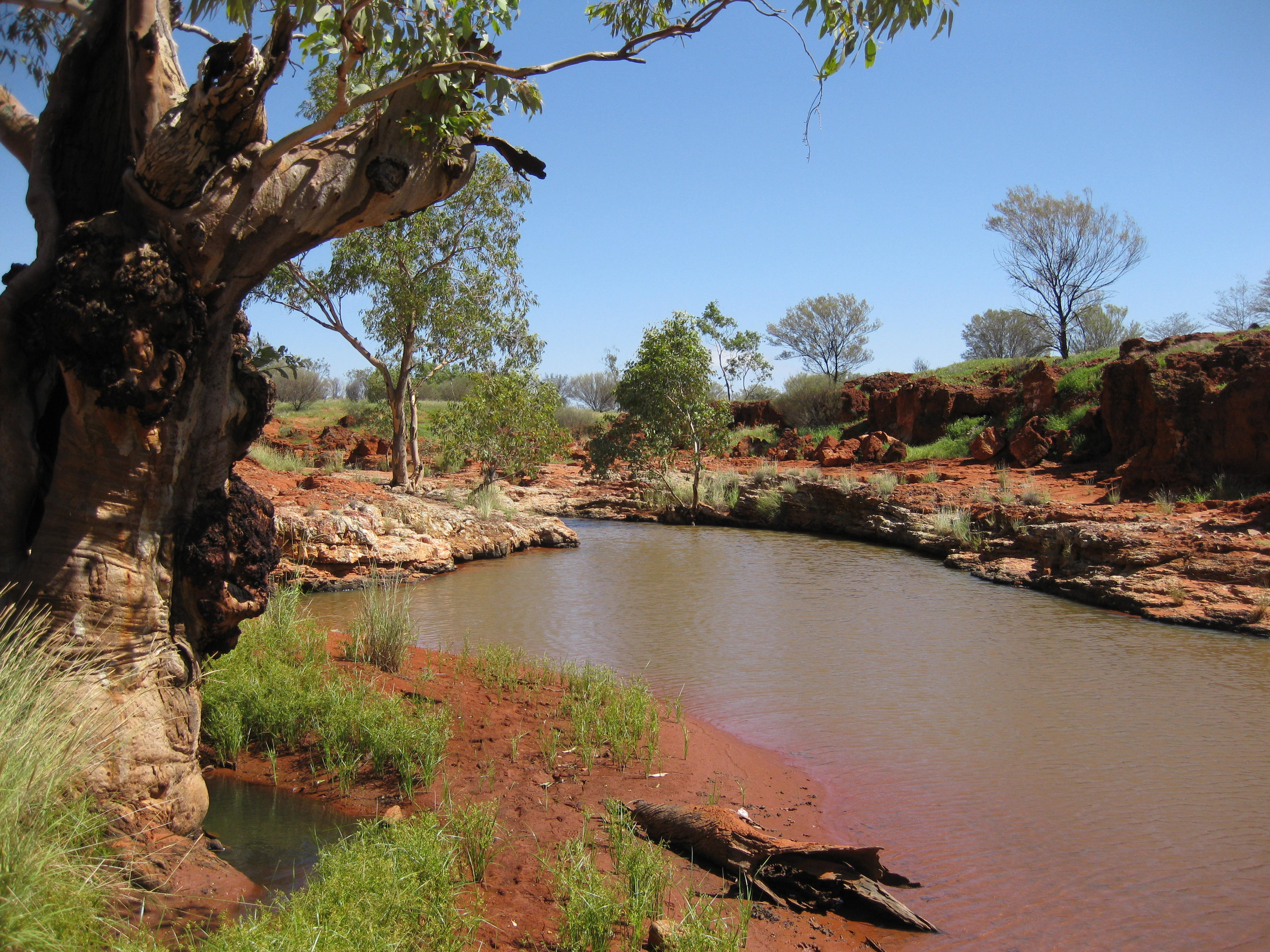
Yaua waterhole after rain

Through the support of the Australian Government's Caring for our Country, Working on Country and Indigenous Protected Areas programs, Anangu rangers and the Imanpa community are addressing these challenges, restoring the landscape and protecting its cultural sites. Land management is based on Kuka Kanyini, "looking after game animals" and aims to increase species which aid the environment. The Rotary Club of Canberra Burley Griffin has also been providing support to the project.

== Significance of Angas Downs ==
Angas Downs is important to the Indigenous Anangu people in the region. As well as biodiversity value, it has significant Tjukurpa (Indigenous law and customary knowledge) places and sacred sites where ceremonies continue to occur. Today the IPA provides employment and income for the Indigenous community, creates learning and training opportunities, and improves health (through exercise and diet). It reconnects the traditional people of this area to their land and culture, instilling a sense of pride.

== Natural resources ==
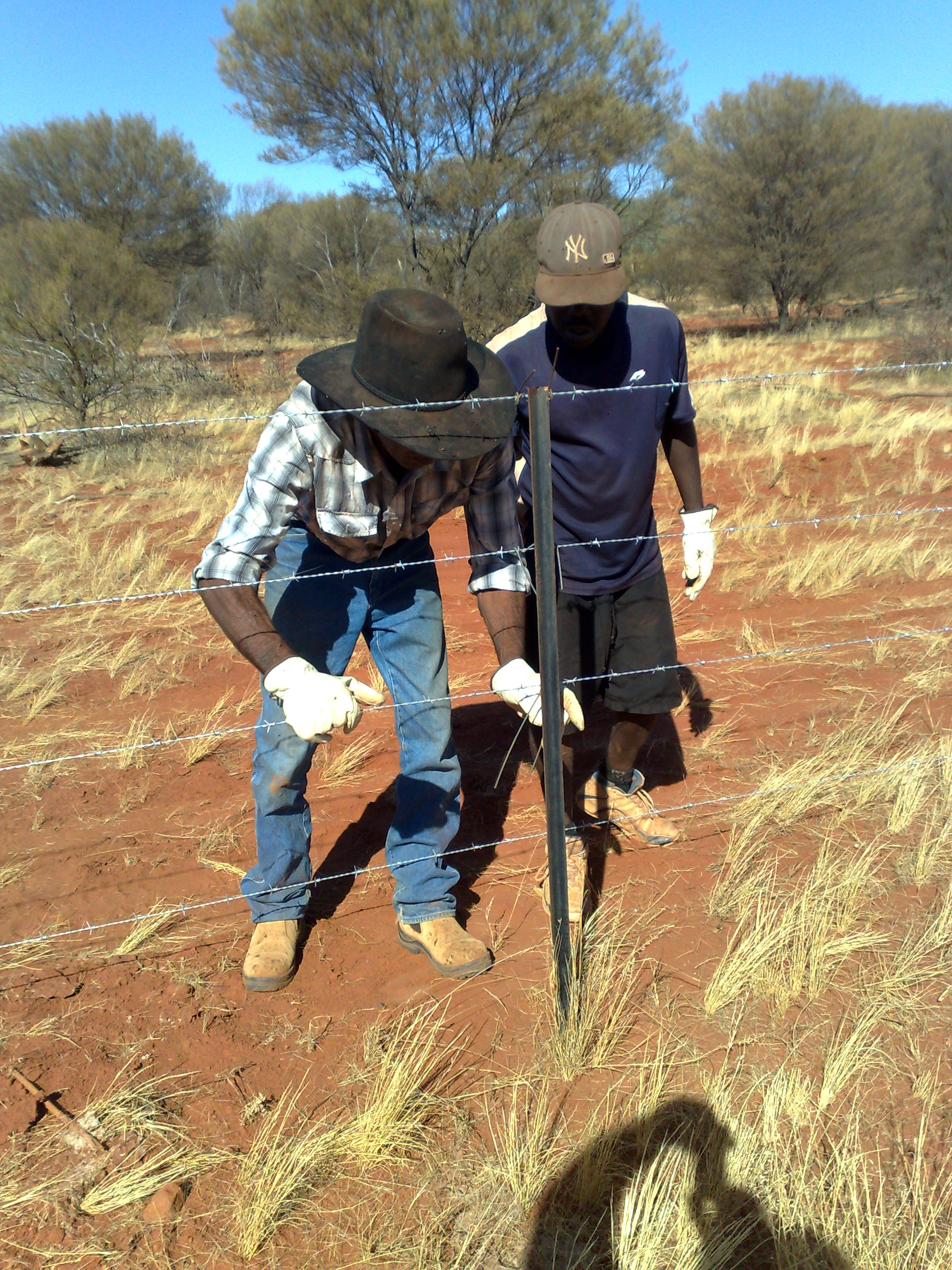
Angas Downs rangers fencing the sanctuary

Angas Downs has rich natural and cultural resources. There are many different types of vegetation and landscapes including mulga woodlands (Acacia aneura), gypsum depressions, limestone plains, spinifex (Triodia spp.) sand dunes, desert oak (Allocasuarina decaisneana) woodlands, alluvial floodplains and quartzite hills. Angas Downs has rich bird life and is home to many species of animals and reptiles many of which are important food and totems to the local Anangu people. Vulnerable listed (NT) quandong (Santalum acuminatum) also occurs on Angas Downs, although they struggle against camel browsing.

Several species of native mammals including echidnas, Ooldea dunnart, lesser hairy-footed dunnart, kultarr, euro (eastern wallaroo), red kangaroo, Gould's wattled bat, lesser long-eared bat, spinifex hopping mouse, sandy inland mouse and dingos have been recorded on the Angas Downs Pastoral Lease. Also, fresh tracks and a burrow of a Dasycercus spp. likely to be the crest-tailed mulgara (Dasycercus cristicauda) were seen by Latz in July 2002. Remote infrared cameras also caught an endangered woma python on camera in a cave in the central sandstone hills – the Liddle Range – in November 2012.

Ninety-nine species of birds have been recorded on Angas Downs. Emu, bustard (bush turkey) are important Tjukurpa and game species, and mulga parrot, Major Mitchell's cockatoo, Australian ringneck, Bourke's parrot and budgerigar are common. A birdwatching checklist is available for Angas Downs.

Rangers on Angas Downs are improving the environment to protect and increase important animals and plants using a combination of traditional knowledge and western science.

== Pastoral history ==
Angas Downs Station was first taken up for pastoral purposes by William Liddle in 1927. He and his descendants, ran sheep and then cattle until the 1990s. As with many pastoral enterprises during the 1980s and 1990s, Angas Downs struggled financially and was eventually taken over by the mortgagee in 1994 before being purchased by the nearby Imanpa community. Since 1994, it has been owned by the Imanpa Development Association Inc., and managed by their company Lisanote Pty. Ltd. Descendants of William Liddle have living areas on the property.

Frederick GG Rose visited Angas Downs during July–October 1962 and documented the people and ways of life. He took specific interest in documenting the process of change in Aboriginal culture in context with contact with white civilisation. He also reported the genealogy of the Liddle family and other Aboriginal people living on Angas Downs. More information on Aboriginal histories of Angas Downs can be found in Fred Rose's book The wind of change in central Australia: The Aborigines at Angas Downs, 1962.

In 2009, Angas Downs was declared an Indigenous Protected Area and remains a resource for members of the Imanpa community, some of whom grew up and worked on Angas Downs.

The property still runs 300-400 head of cattle, restricted to a 266-square-kilometre (103 sq mi) paddock in the southeast. Tourists can join tours to Angas Downs led by members of the Imanpa community to learn about the pastoral, cultural and natural history of the property.

== Imanpa ==
Residents of Imanpa include Matuntara descendants (the original occupiers of Angas Downs region), Yankunytjatjara and Pitjantjatjara people. The Imanpa Development Association holds the lease for Angas Downs through its company Lisanote Pty Ltd.

=== Challenges ===
As for many remote Indigenous Communities in Australia, the Imanpa community faces significant health, employment and educational challenges. Senior men and women say there is a breakdown in the old ways and that law and culture – the Tjukurpa is being lost. Land management activities restore the station environment and also improve the self-esteem and motivation of the Indigenous people by appealing to their aspiration to care for their country, and provide opportunities for training, employment and economic development. The Anangu elders, the Tjilpis and Myinkmaku, believe many social and health problems are the result of a breakdown in the old ways, and that implementation of Tjukurpa (Anangu customary knowledge) and restoring the land would help solve these problems. Piranpa (white fella science) and Tjukurpa can work together to do these things. It will make sure Tjukurpa and culture continue, and get children and grandchildren to learn about land. Looking after land is the key to Tjukurpa. Also more bush tucker means healthier food.

Anangu want to increase the amount of game animals like emu (Dromaius novaehollandiae), red kangaroo (Macropus rufus) and plant food like quandong (Santalum acuminatum). Anangu also want to bring back species that aren't in the land any more like rufous hare-wallaby and common brushtail possum.

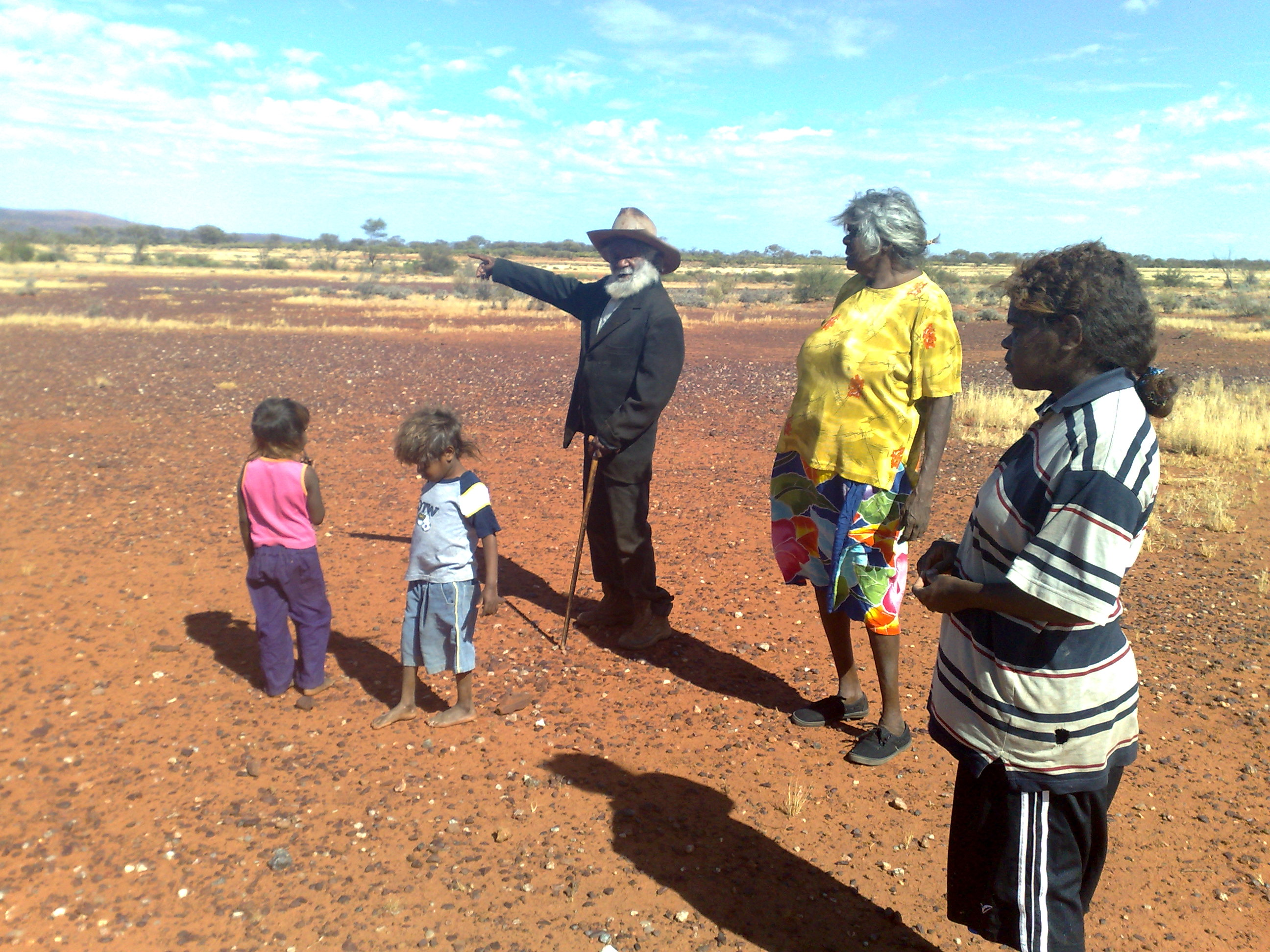
Tjuki tells a dreaming story about Manpi (a pigeon) – Angas Downs IPA provides opportunity for elders to impart cultural and environmental knowledge to younger generations

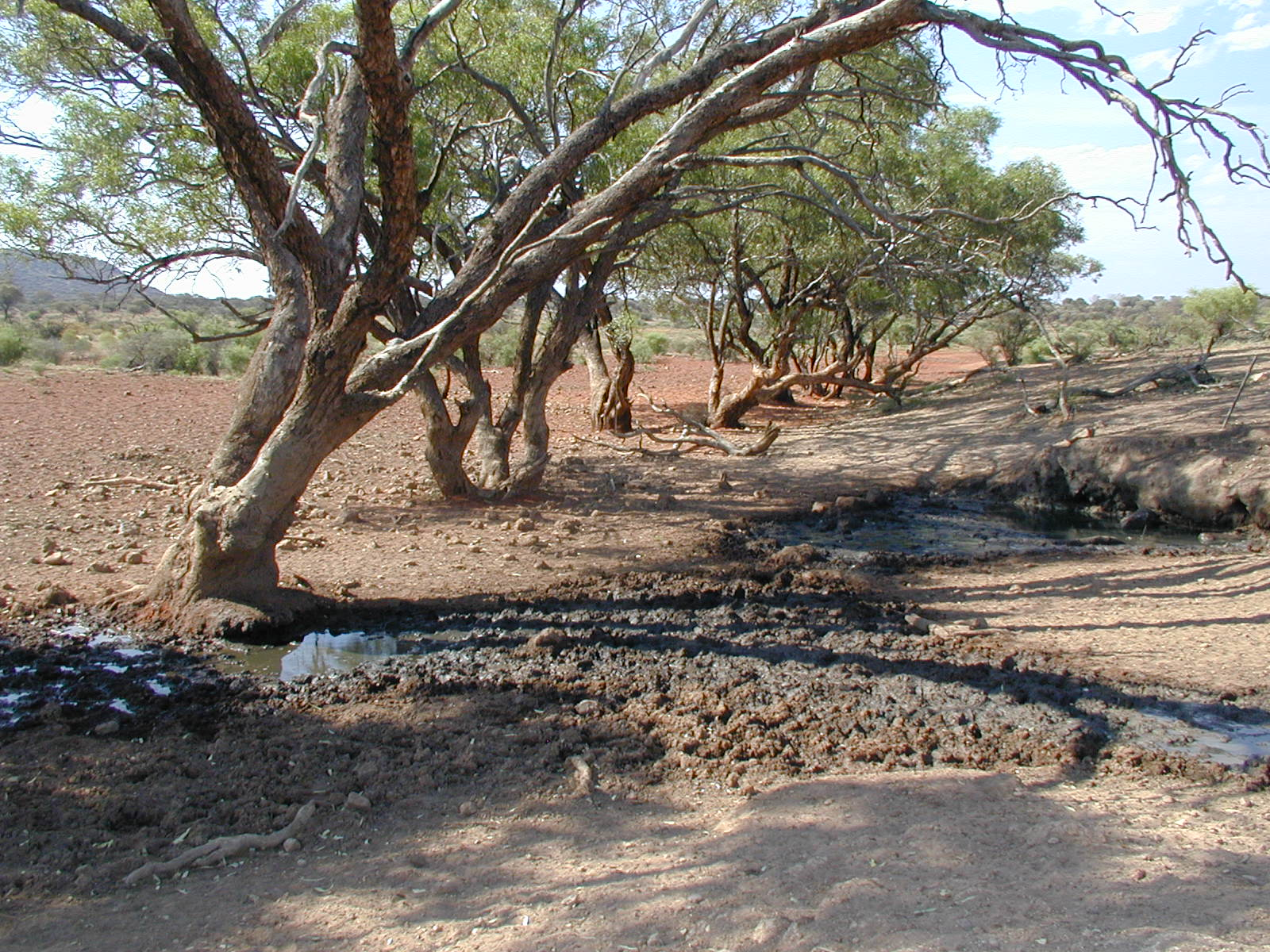
Wilbia (Wilpiya) soak before restoration, damage by feral camels 1998

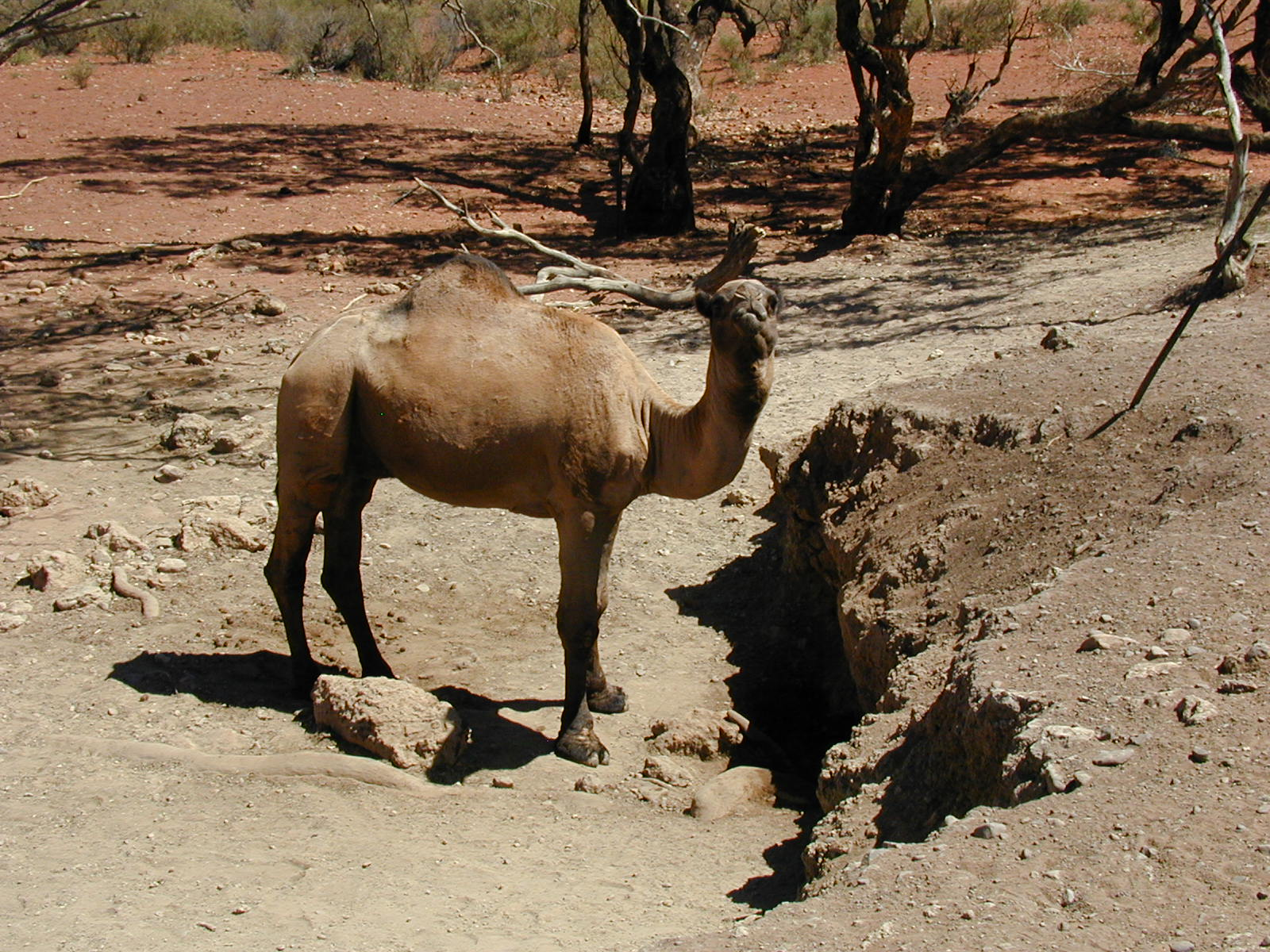
Feral camel at Wilbia/Wilpiya soak before restoration 1998

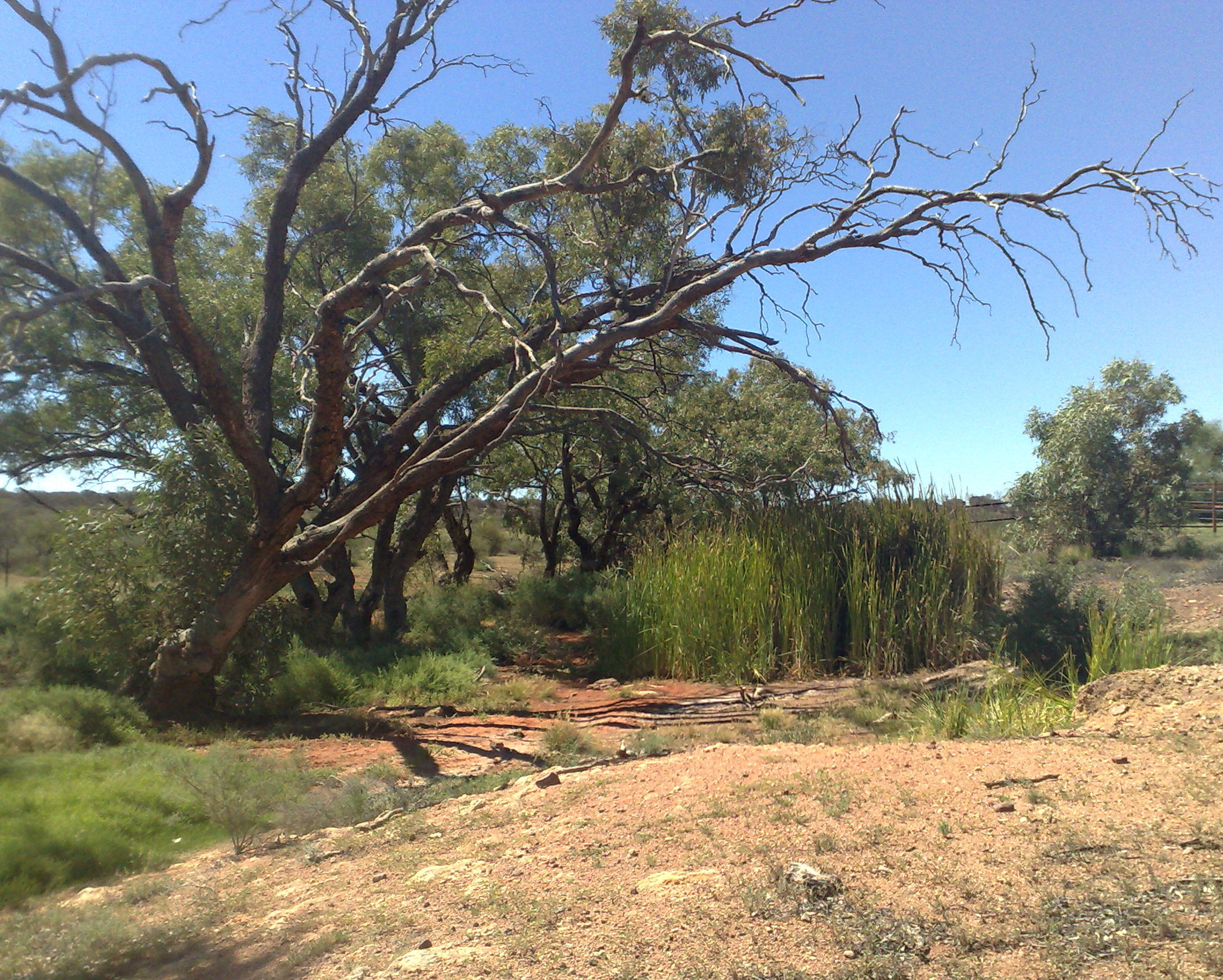
Wilbia/Wilpiya soak after restoration 2010

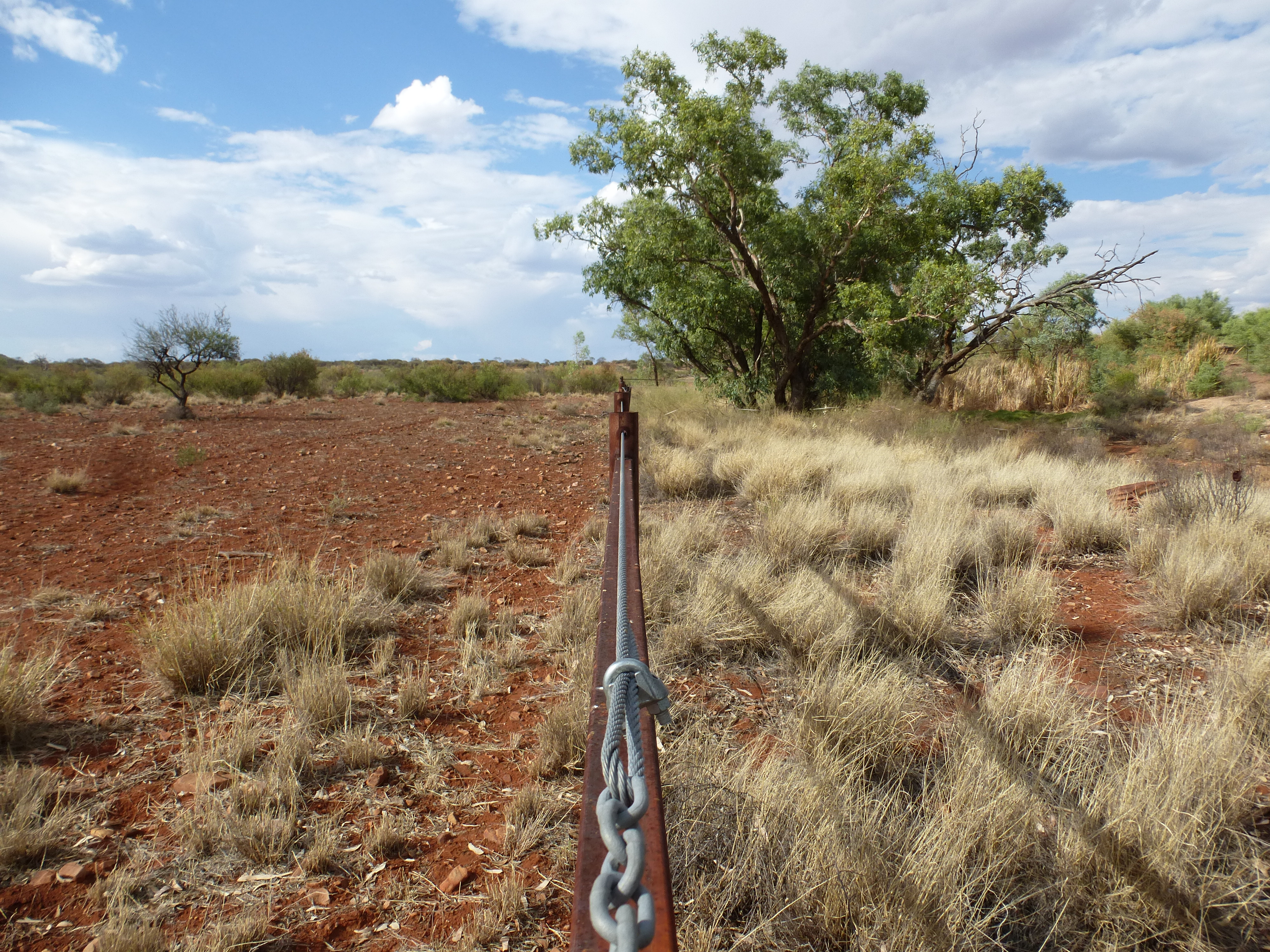
Camel control fence on Angas Downs showing improvements to vegetation without camel, cattle and horse browsing.

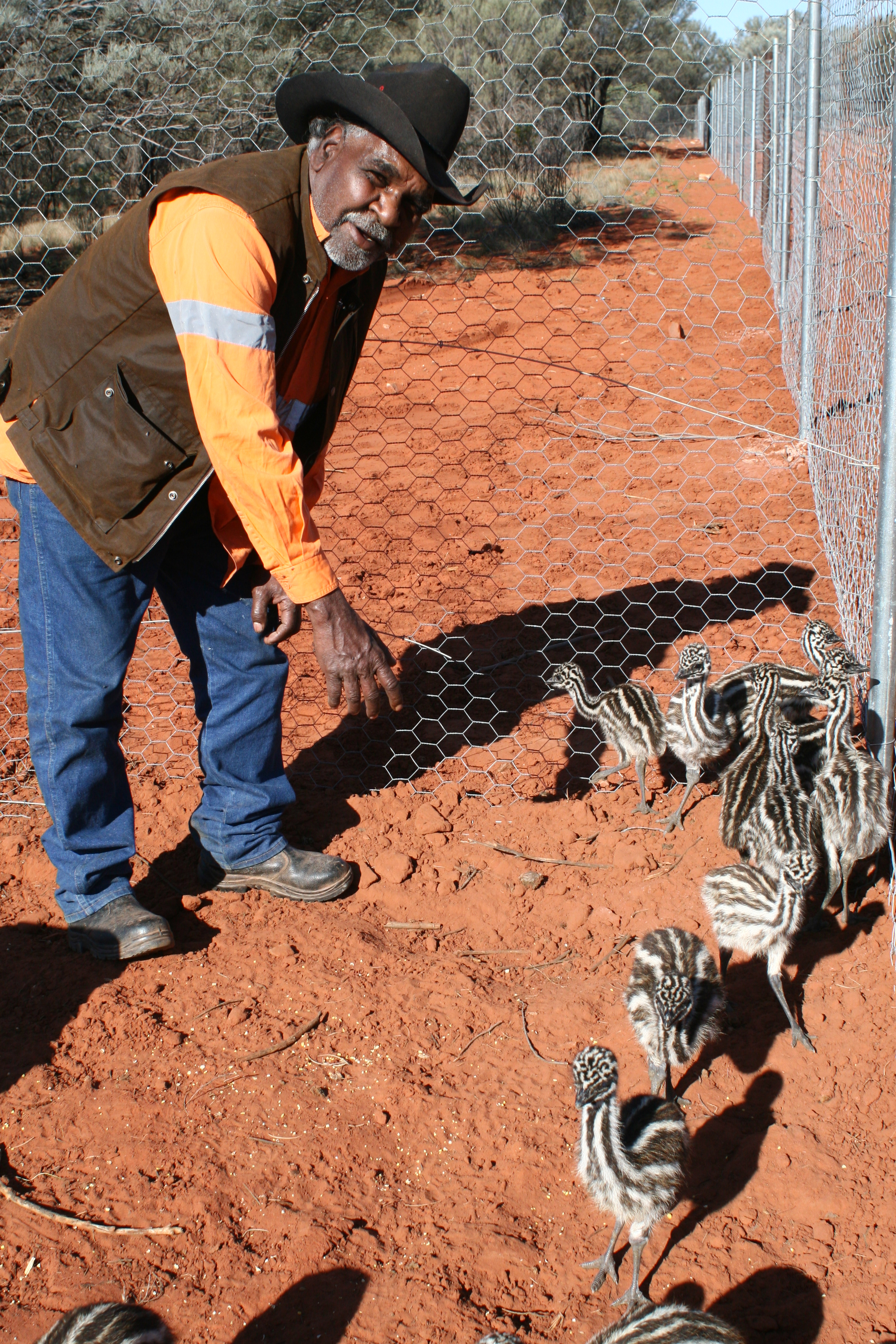
Ranger David Wongway looking after emu chicks on Angas Downs September 2010.jpg

== Angas Downs Indigenous Protected Area Plan of Management ==
Through the support of the Australian Government's Caring for our Country, Working on Country and Indigenous Protected Areas programs, Anangu rangers and the Imanpa community are restoring the landscape and protecting their cultural heritage using the Kuka Kanyini principles.

A plan of management was prepared by the members of the community with support from Australian Wildlife Services. It draws on traditional land management practices and sets out priorities for scientists and wildlife managers to work with Anangu from Imanpa to increase game, control ferals and protect cultural sites and the environment.

=== Objectives ===
To manage land and wildlife resources to maintain Anangu culture, conserve biodiversity and enable sustainable production in support of human communities and economic development. In greater detail, the plan sets out how to:

- increase wildlife populations and estimate hunting yields
- identify wildlife refuge areas
- restore and protect water sources
- restore patch burning practices
- control feral animals and weeds
- exchange information across the region.

The plan outlines the significance of Angas Downs' biodiversity, the importance of its conservation and its contribution to the Imanpa community. It details environment restoration and significantly, proposes development of a wildlife sanctuary and breeding facility and a tourist facility. It restricts cattle to a 250km2 zone to protect other more fragile and significant regions of Angas Downs.

"Ara nyangaku tjungurni Anangu-ku ara (Tjukurpa / Wapar) munu piran-ku (scientific) ara wirura Malu; Kalaya; Tinka munu Tjulpu tjuta-ku ngura, palyanyku atunymankunytjaku, nganampa ngura munu mai ngaranyangka uranma" "Mixing Anangu customary knowledge – the Tjukurpa (law) with Piranpa (non-Anangu) scientific knowledge to improve wildlife habitat, enhance landscapes, and harvest species on a sustainable basis."

== Benefits of indigenous involvement in land management ==
The benefit of Indigenous Australians working in land and wildlife management is well documented. Proactive Indigenous wildlife management combined with science can support sustainable harvesting, provide employment and income, create learning and training opportunities, improve Indigenous health (through exercise and diet) and reconnect them to the land and their cultural values, installing a sense of pride. Angas Downs Indigenous Protected Area aims to provide opportunities to Indigenous Australians to become involved in wildlife and land management and use their own knowledge to make decisions affecting their land. The IPA provides employment and income for theIndigenous community, creates learning and training opportunities, and improves health (through exercise and diet).

== Angas Downs Anangu rangers ==
Anangu rangers employed by the Indigenous Protected Area and Working on Country program are putting in fences to keep ferals out, building a 288-square-kilometre (111 sq mi) wildlife sanctuary area, increasing watering points and cleaning water troughs to encourage more game species (red kangaroo, emu, perentie, goanna) and healthier landscapes. Angas Downs rangers are:

- Restoring and reactivating water sources
- Erecting feral animal exclusion fences (see Australian feral camel)
- Implementing feral animal eradication programs
- Controlling weeds and restoring native species
- Helping to increase native species, especially game species
- Monitoring wildlife and landscapes using Cybertracker
- Implementing patch burning
- Documenting bush tucker, medicine plants and cultural places
- Helping to start small scale tourism on Angas Downs
- Setting up breeding and holding facilities for emus
- Fencing and fire protection for rare plants such as Christmas tree mulga and quandong.

== Small mammal and reptile surveys ==
Angas Downs rangers conduct regular reptile and small mammal surveys across Angas Down's landscapes with scientists and volunteers using pitfall and funnel traps, and active searches. 51 reptile, 10 mammal (including one bat) and 4 frog species have been recorded to date. Simoselaps betholdi (Jan's banded snake), Suta punctata (little spotted snake), Demansia psammophis (yellow-faced whipsnake), Tiliqua multifasciata (Centralian blue-tongued skink), Ramphotyphlops endoterus (interior blind snake), Pygopus nigriceps (western hooded scaly-foot), woma, Nephrurus laevissimus, Nephrurus levis levis, Morethia ruficauda and Egernia inornata (desert skink) among others have been detected. Mammals detected included kultarr, Wongai ningaui, spinifex hopping mice, sandy inland mice and lesser hairy-footed dunnart.

== Emu breeding on Angas Downs ==
Emu populations are very low on Angas Downs, as is the case in much of the Northern Territory. They are an important species to the local Anangu and traditional owners and to ecological processes. In combination with land management and control of feral animals, Anangu rangers will implement an emu breeding program to increase emus in the landscape. Local knowledge has suggested that emus may also increase the success of quandong (Santalum acuminatum) germination after the seed is eaten and has passed through the gut – this could be due to a combination of seed coat break down and being deposited in rich nutrient filled dung. They also help to disperse the seeds across the landscape. It is a goal of Angas Downs to increase bush tucker species such as quandong and will trial use of emus in quandong regeneration in coming years

In August 2010, Anangu rangers took delivery of 20 emu chicks from an emu farm in WA. They were flown into Ayers Rock airport (Uluru) by Qantas and driven to the Angas Downs Indigenous Protected Area. After successful breeding, the emus will be released into a larger sanctuary area on Angas Downs. Angas Downs rangers also now own an egg incubator which will be used for increasing breeding success in following years. The chicks and incubator were bought with donations provided by the Rotary Club of Canberra Burley Griffin. Progress of the emu chicks can be found here.

== Aerial surveys of Angas Downs – camels, kangaroos and feral horse populations ==
Aerial surveys of the Angas Downs Indigenous Protected Area and surrounding lands were completed in June 2010. The survey was flown by Dr George Wilson using standard procedures for fixed-wing aircraft surveys. Indigenous observer, Brad Lander, and Jennifer Smits counted animals seen at low level and 200m on either side of the aircraft. Species targeted/observed included camels, kangaroos, horses, feral cattle, emus, euros, dingos and bustards (turkeys).

The study was vital to understanding populations of kangaroos and pressures from camel and horse populations on the property and hence native wildlife.

Using mapping program ArcGis 9.3, observations were interpolated to form maps showing spatial variability (animals/km^{2}) of populations across the region. Estimated average density rates of kangaroos and camels across Angas Downs was 0.91 ± 0.16 and 0.24 ±0.07 per km^{2} respectively. It was noted that camel populations were largely dispersed due to recent high rainfall in central Australia (as at June 2010). Spatial variability of grazing pressures was also investigated.

== Trial tours ==
Angas Downs is interested in development of small scale, tourism ventures. Angas Downs is on the main road to Uluru National Park and Watarrka National Park and has many thousands of visitors cross it each week.

Led by members of the Imanpa community, Australian Wildlife Services helped coordinate a few trial tour runs through the property including Rotary groups interested in culture, education and philanthropic activities and University/TAFE student groups interested in environment and wildlife. Angas Downs participated in a workshop called "Stepping Stones" at the Imanpa community in May 2010 to help develop tourism on Angas Downs.

== Support for Angas Downs ==
There is also potential for other benefactors to provide support, technical advice and training to the Anangu rangers who are being employed to complete the work. The Rotary Club of Canberra Burley Griffin raised funds for installation of a solar pump to feed a trough for wildlife, 20 emu chicks for breeding and an emu egg incubator to raise emu chicks. The emus in captivity continue to be supported by the Rotary Club via funding for emu food.

== International Wildlife Ranching Symposium, South Africa ==
Angas Downs' Indigenous rangers were lucky to be sponsored to visit South Africa and attend the International Wildlife Ranching Symposium, South Africa in Kimberley in October 2011. The theme of the Symposium was – The business of conservation – science, livelihoods and values. Anangu rangers benefited from an itinerary that enabled them to witness and be exposed to:

- intensive wildlife management including techniques for moving wildlife on game ranches
- Indigenous guides and rangers in national parks in private game reserves
- tourism and accommodation based on conservation of wildlife and land management.

== Gallery ==
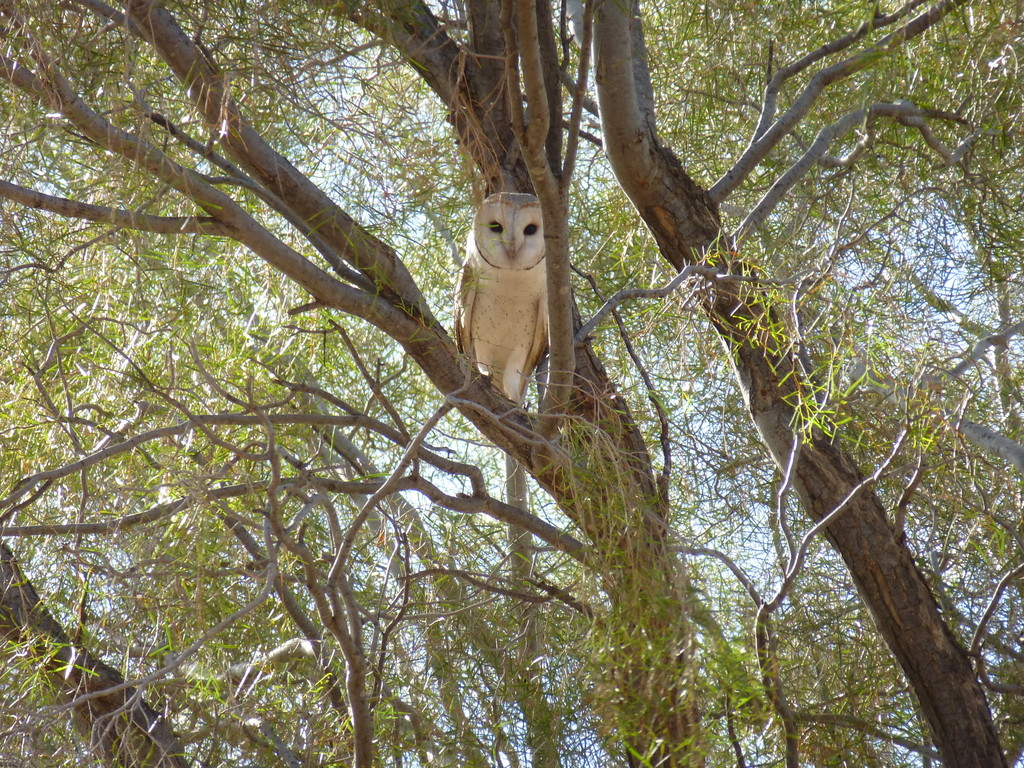
Barn owl on Angas Downs IPA, NT

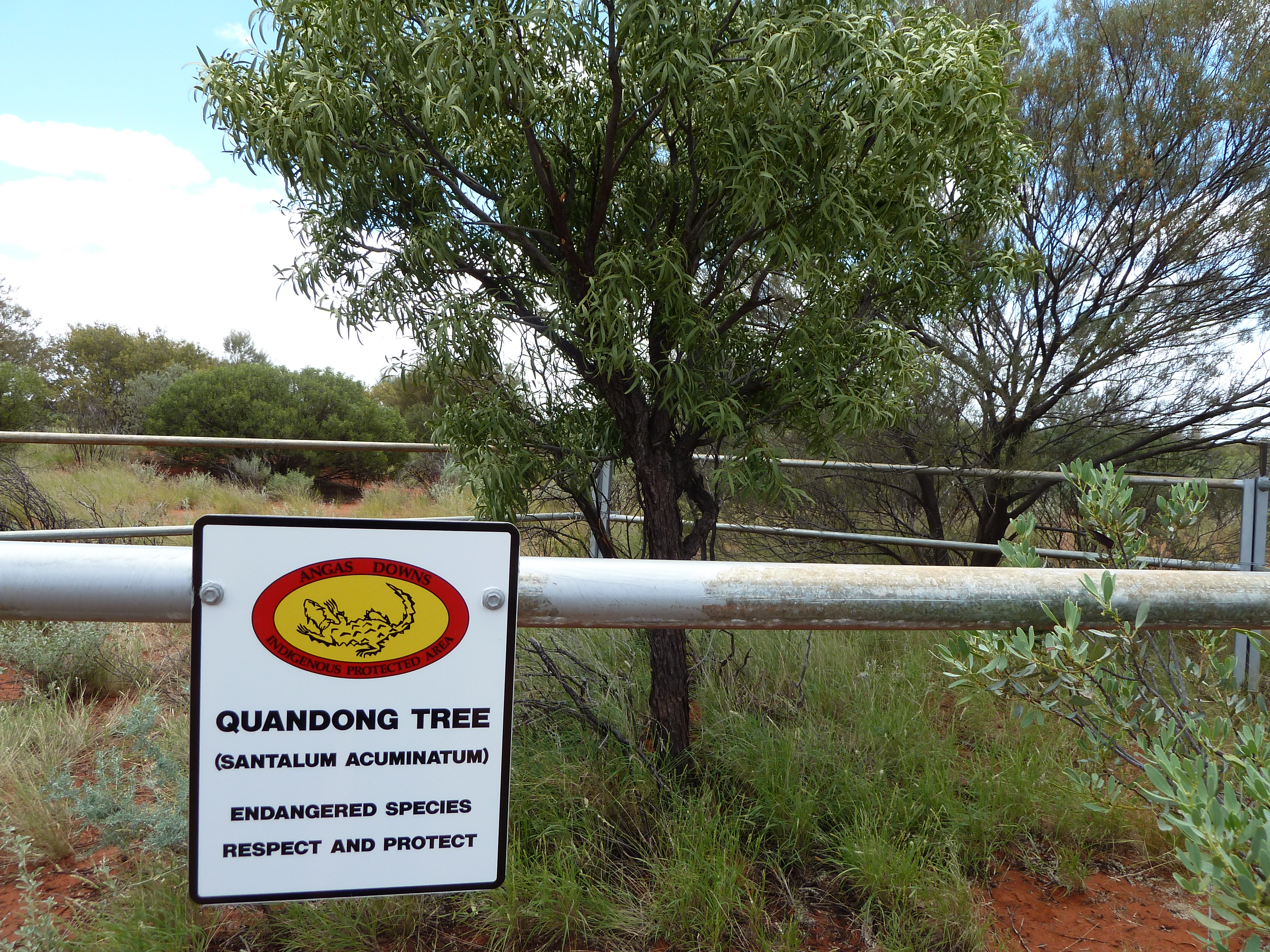

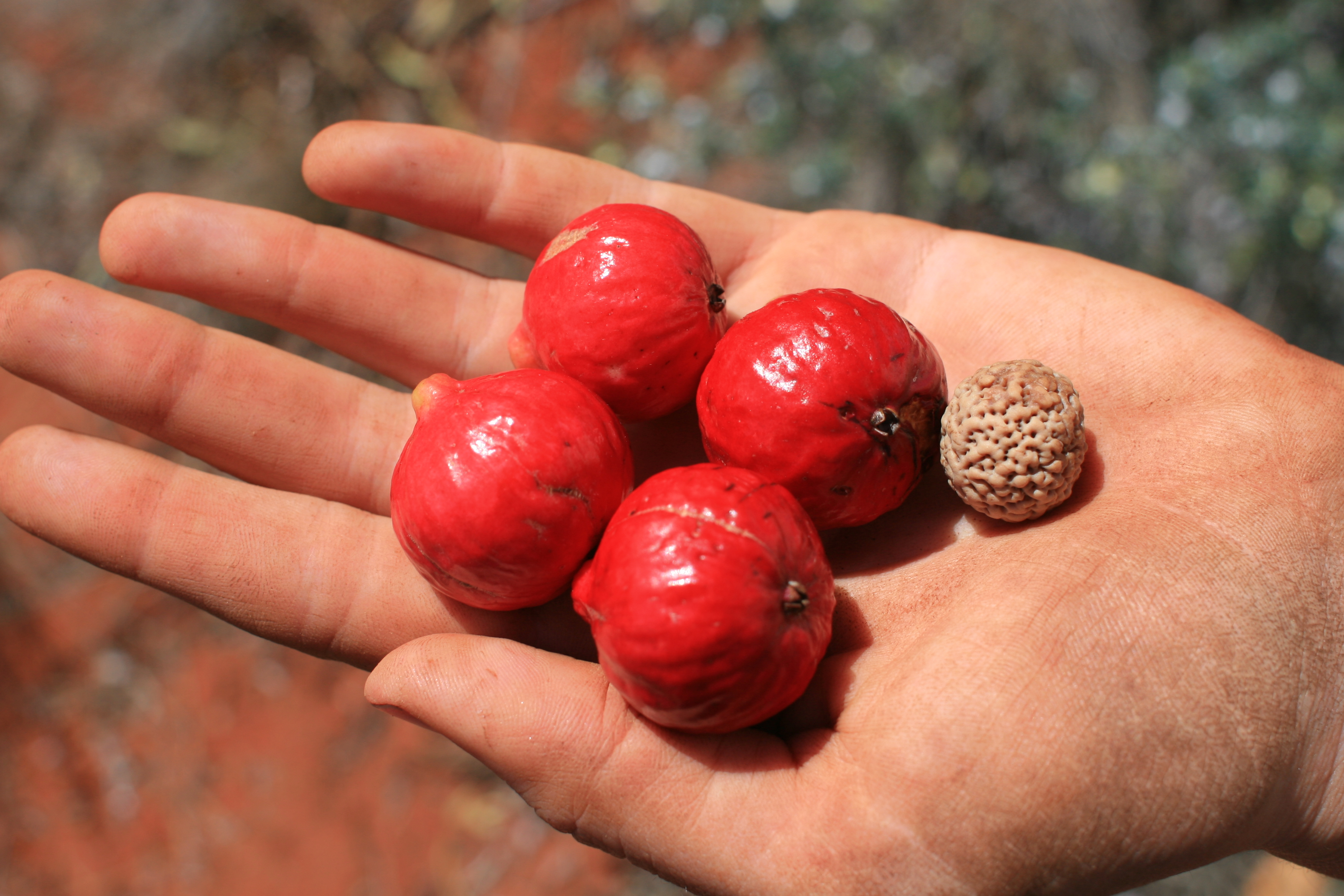
Quandong (Santalum acuminatum) fruit & seeds at Angas Downs, NT

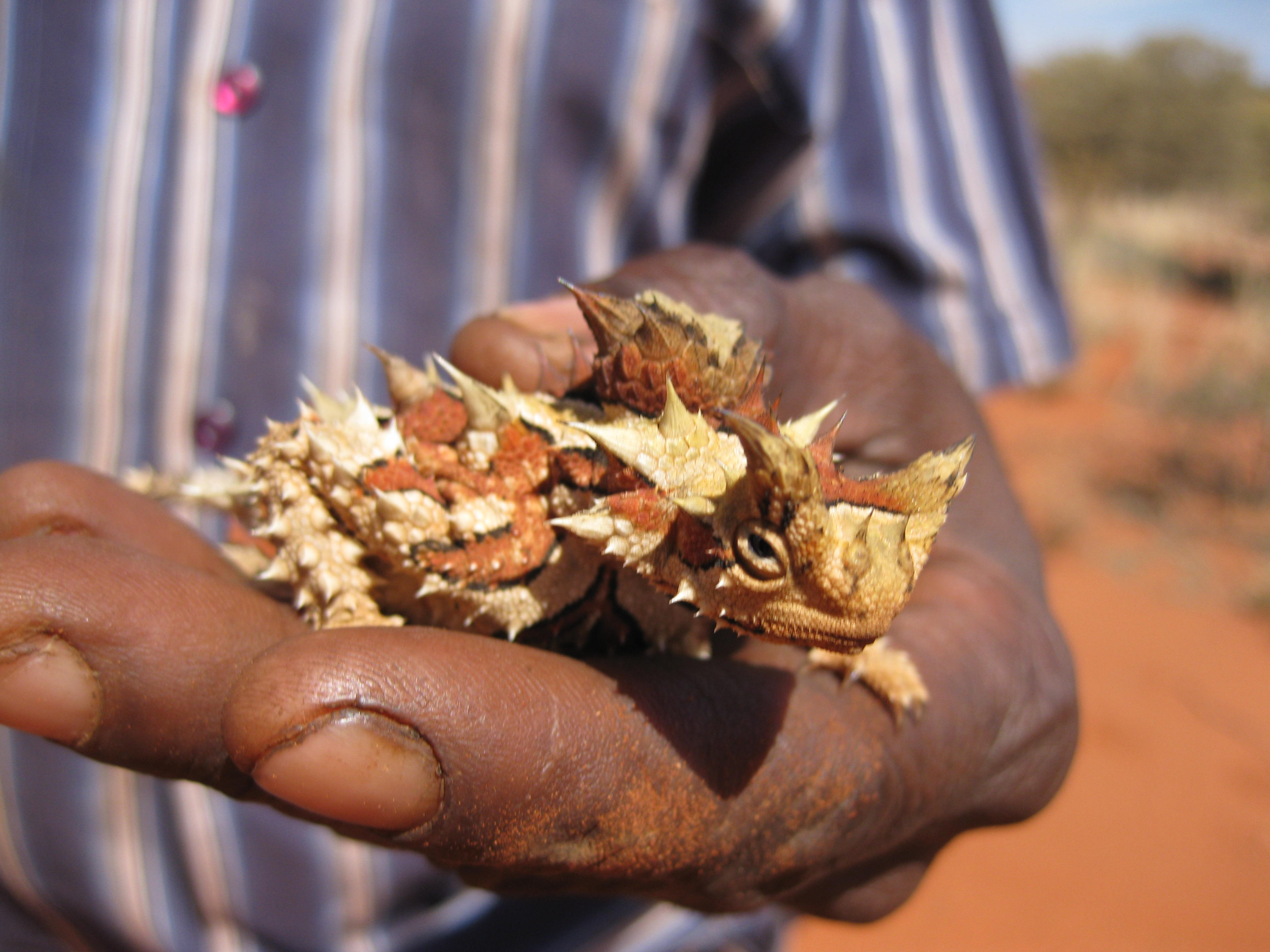
Thorny devil (Moloch horridus) is the Angas Downs mascot and appears on the logo

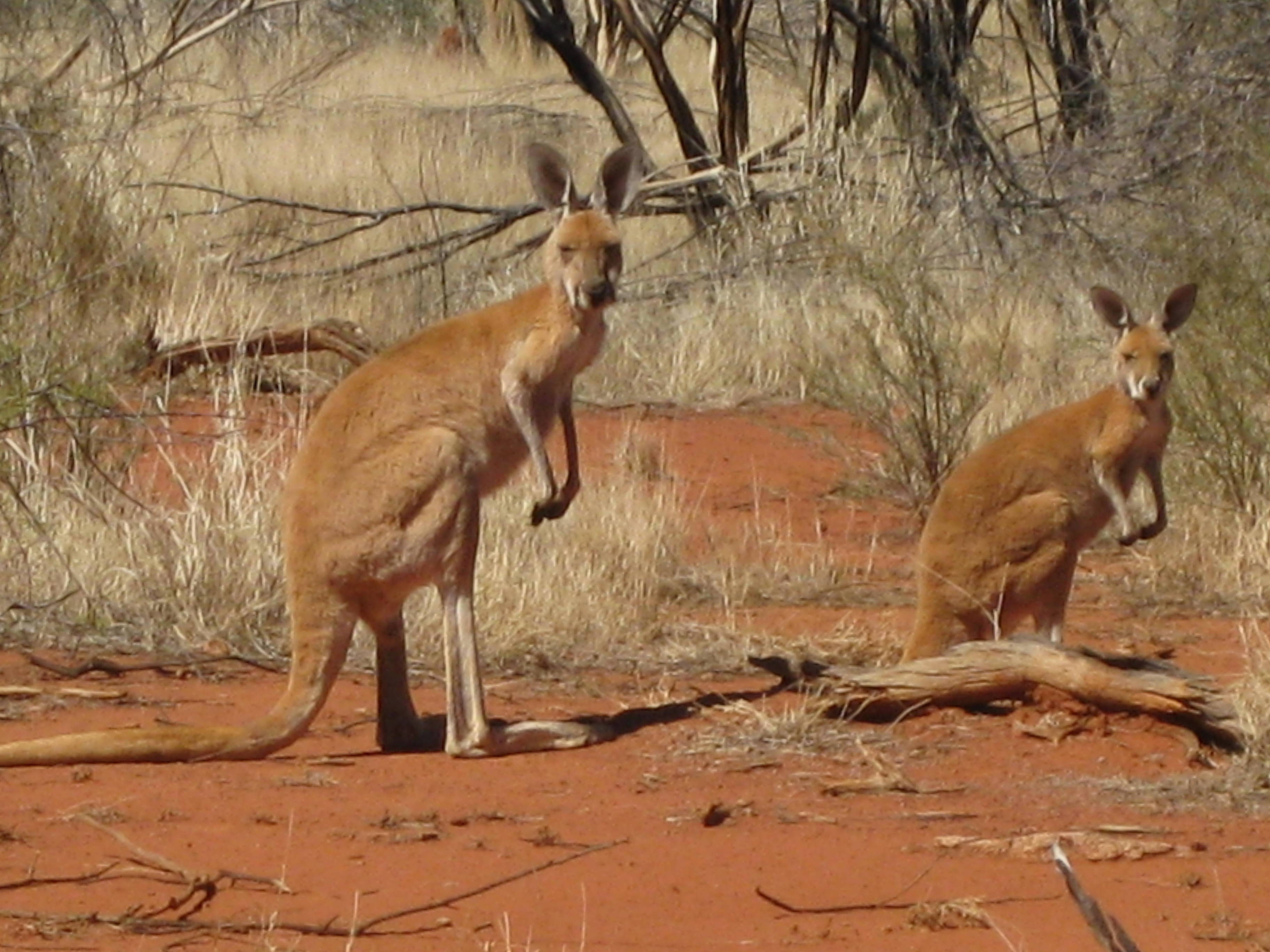
Red kangaroo (Macropus rufus) on Angas Downs

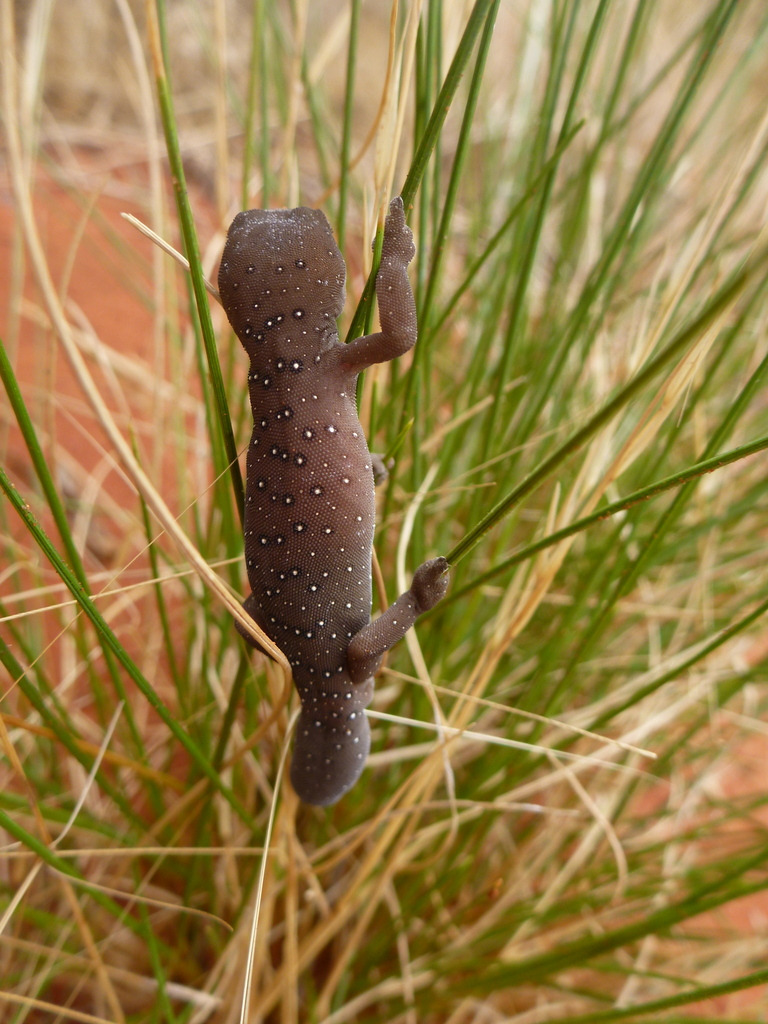
Strophurus elderi jewelled gecko on Angas Downs

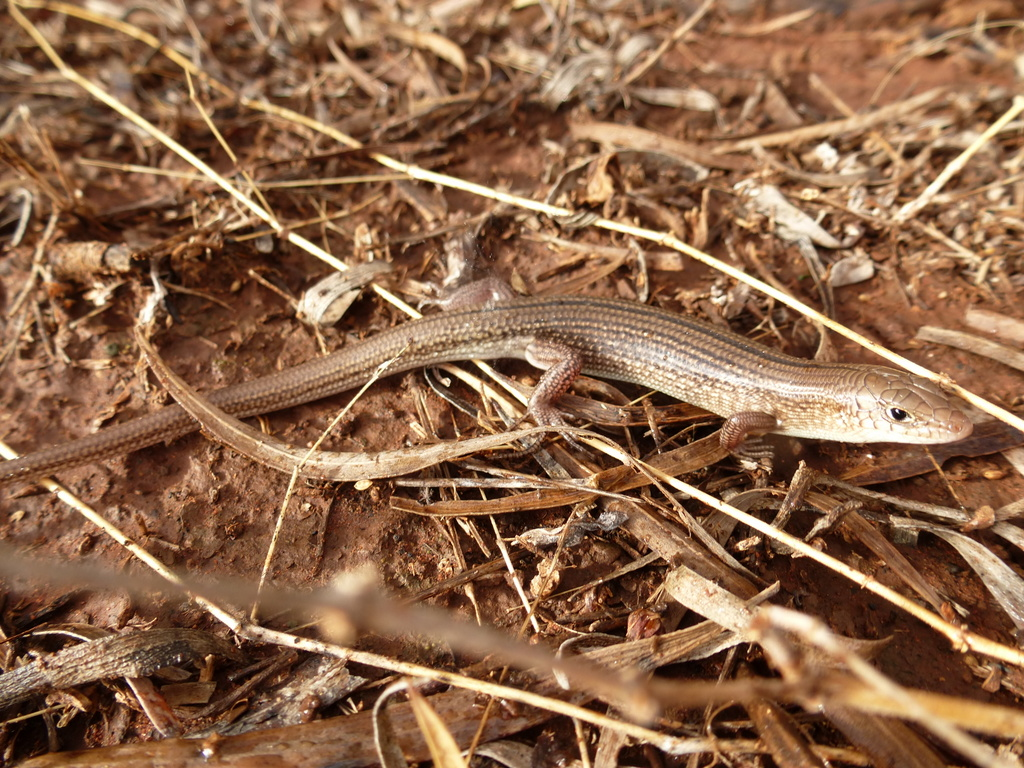
Ctenotus helenae on Angas Downs IPA, NT

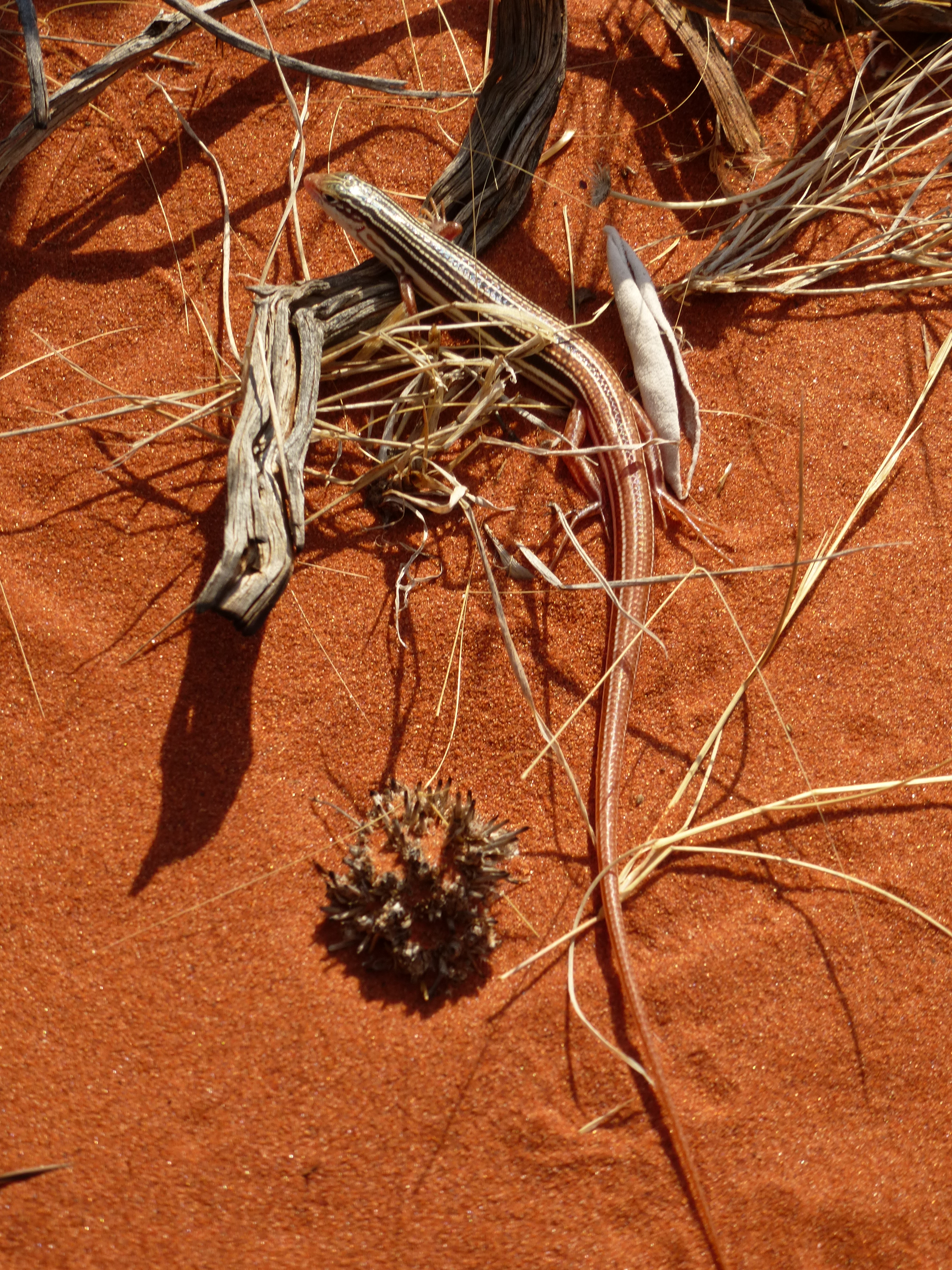
Ctenotus leae on Angas Downs

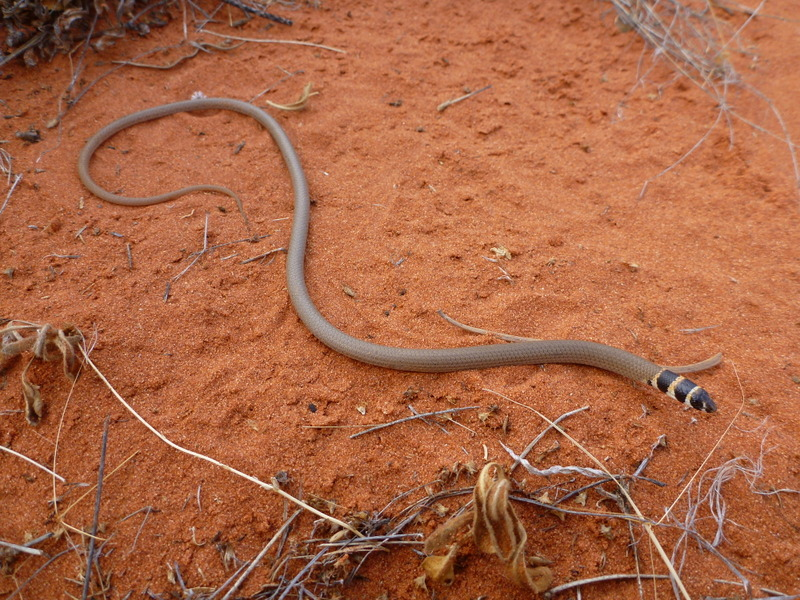
Delma demosa on Angas Downs IPA, NT

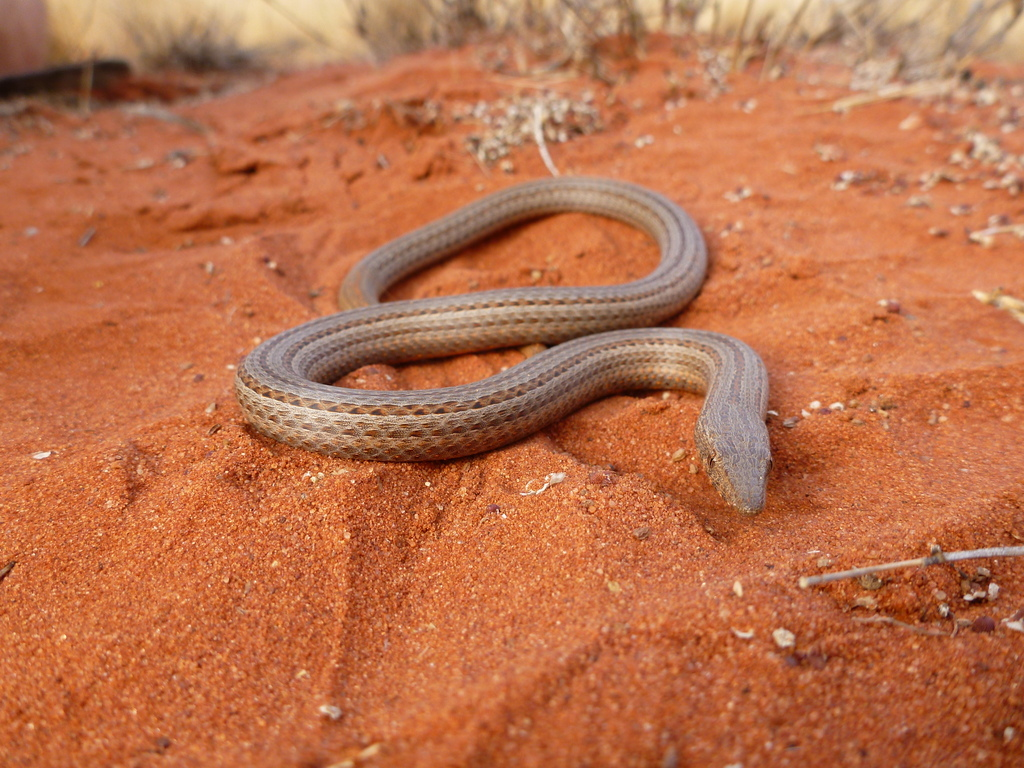
Burton's legless lizard on Angas Downs IPA, NT

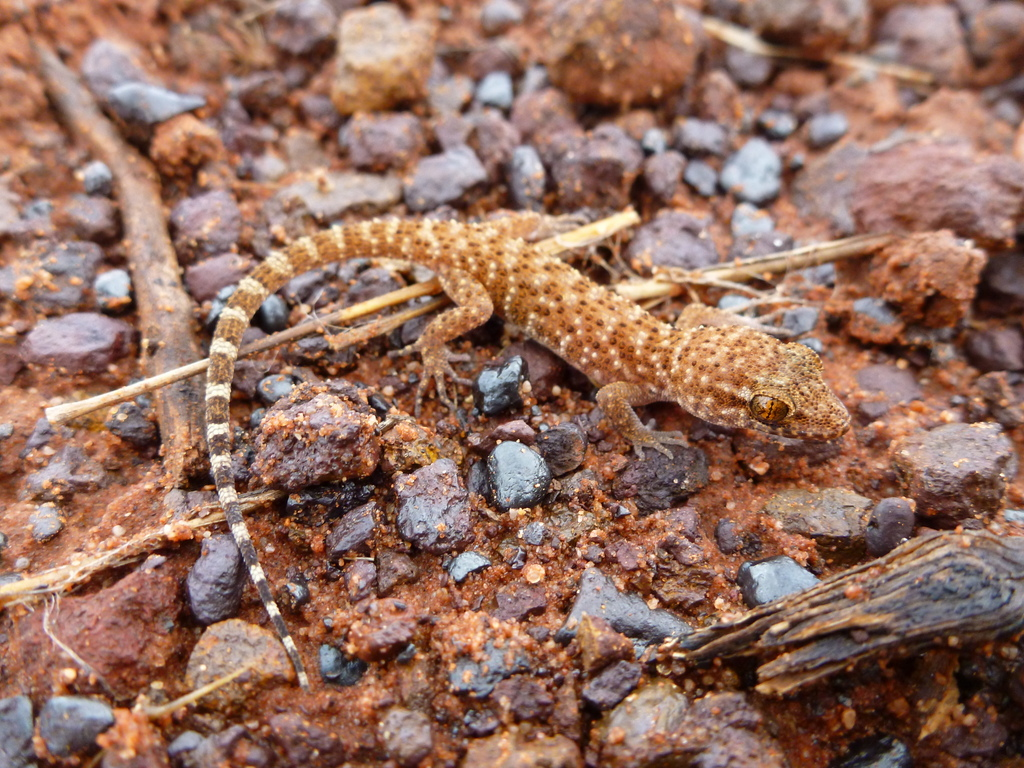
Bynoe's gecko on Angas Downs IPA, NT

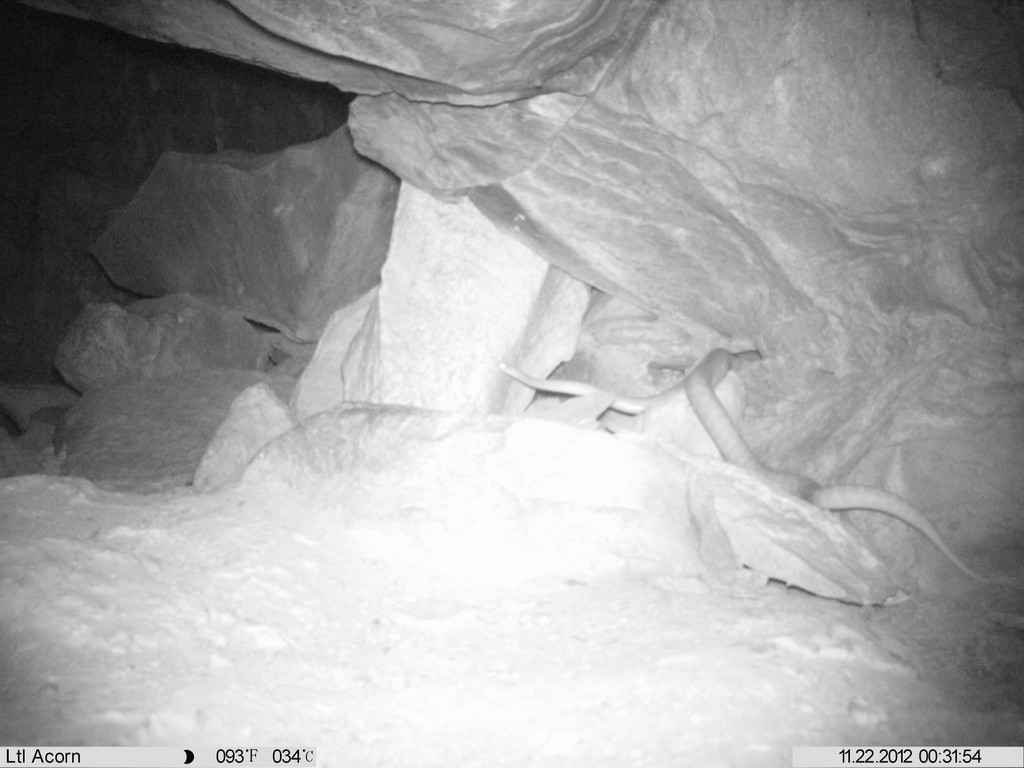
Remote camera capture of woma python on Angas Downs IPA, NT

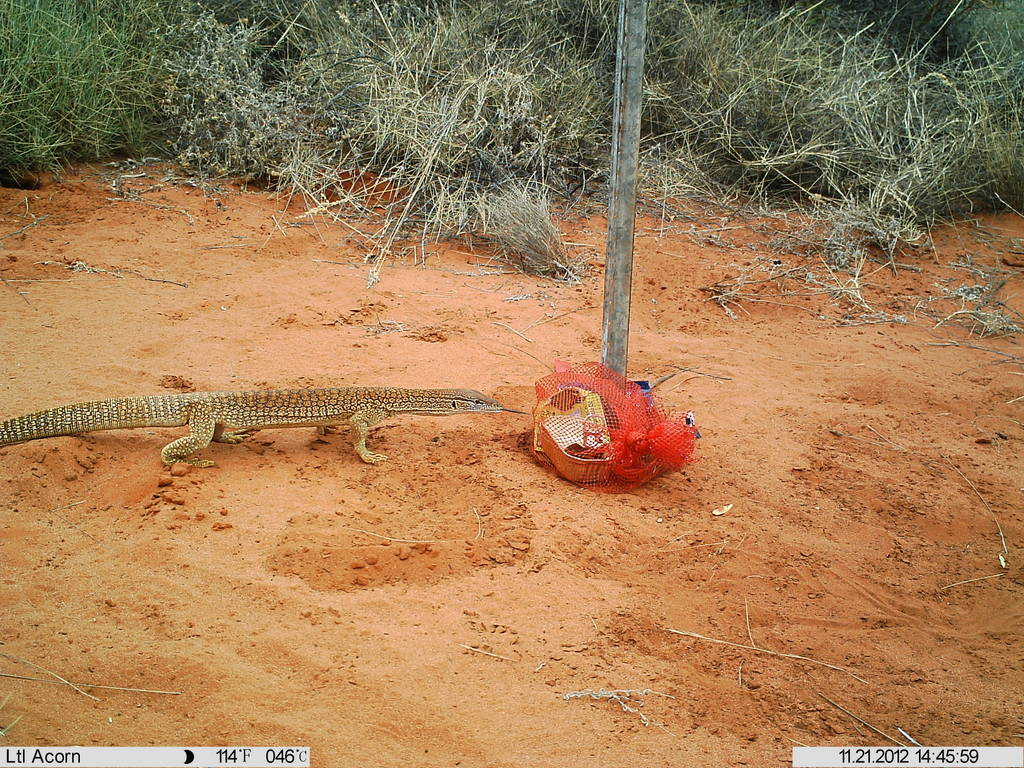
Using Remote camera and lure to capture sand goanna on camera – on Angas Downs IPA, NT

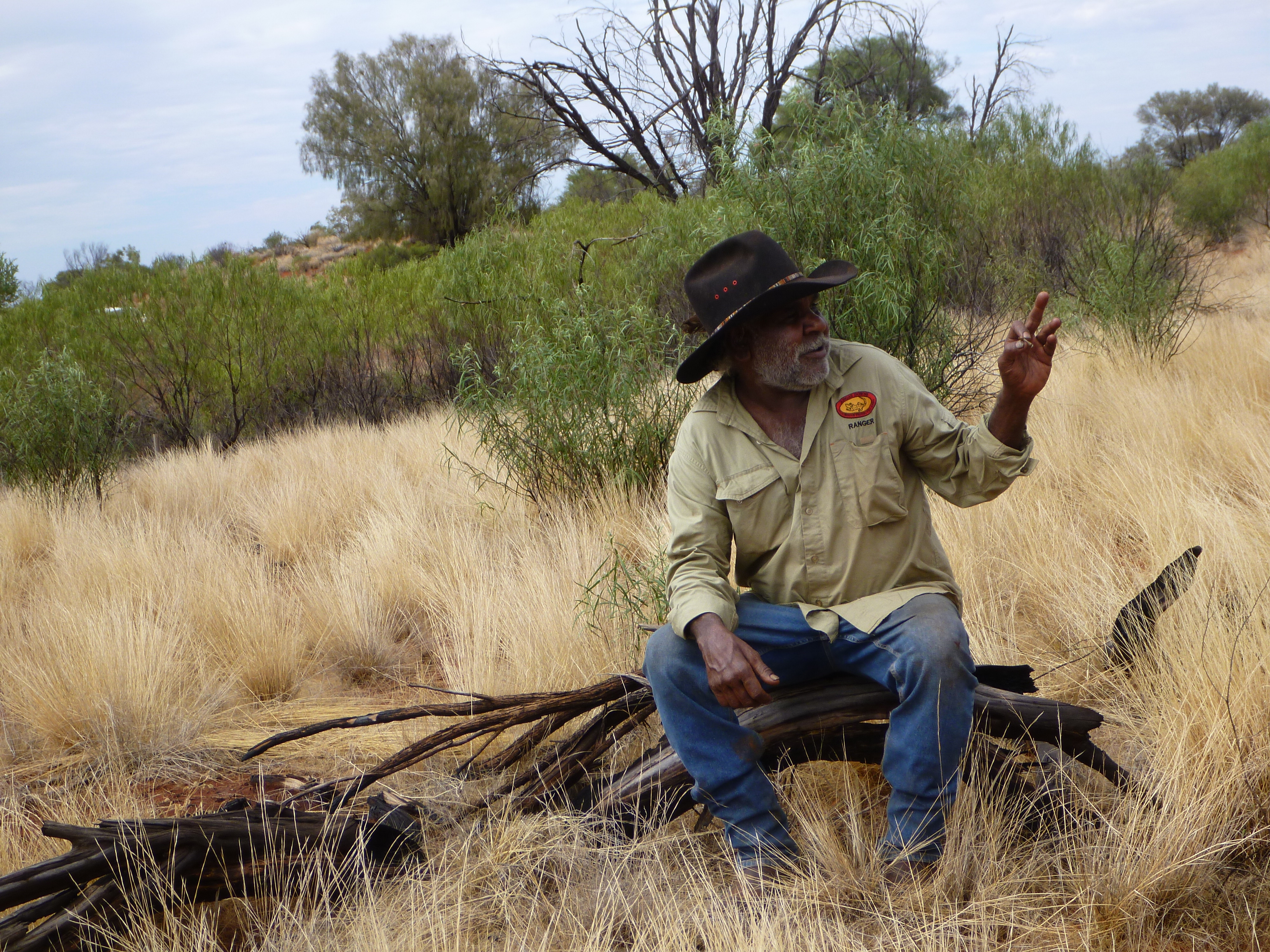
Angas Downs Ranger David Wongway on Angas Downs, NT

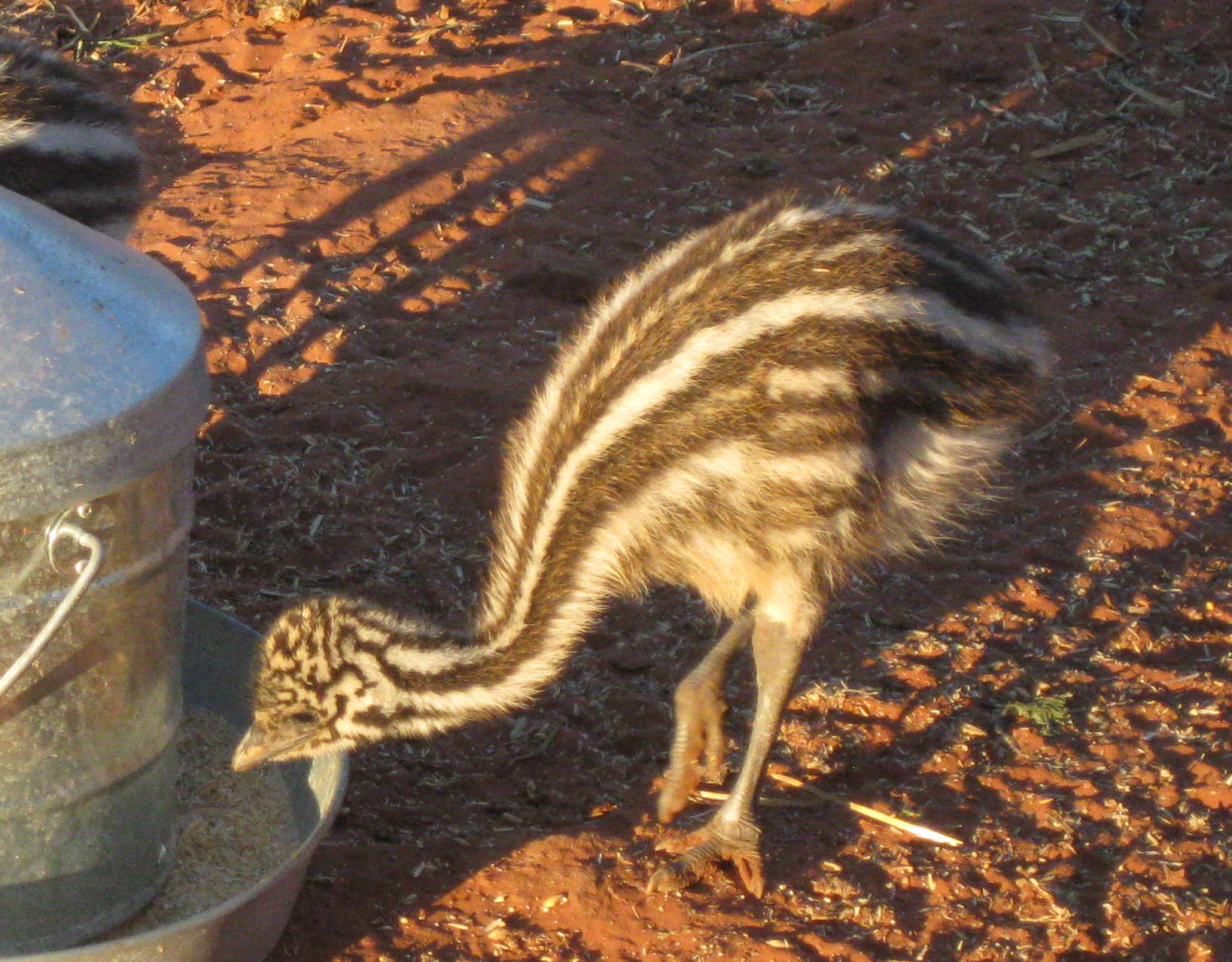
Emu chick on Angas Downs Aug 2010

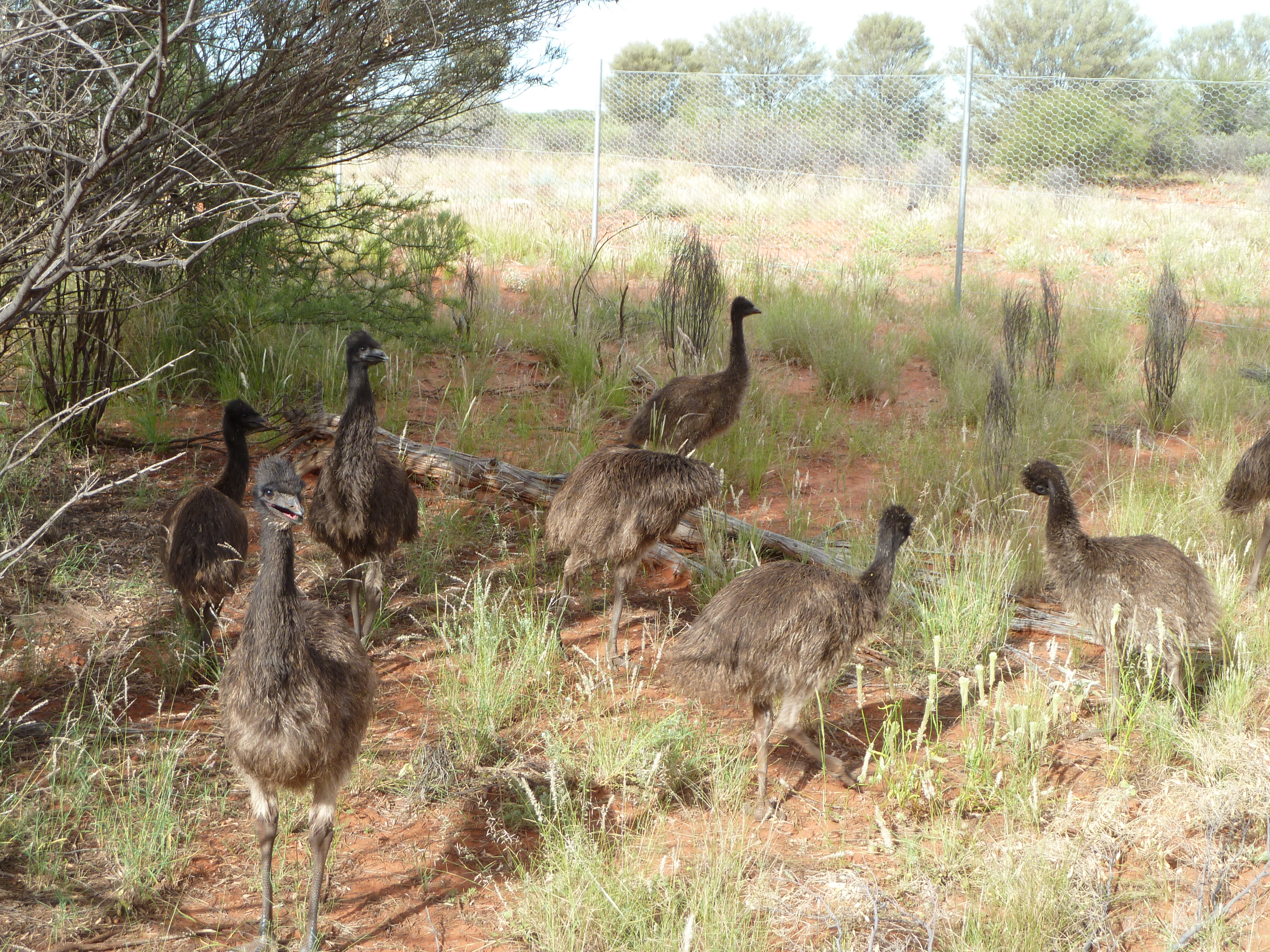
Juvenile emus getting bigger on Angas Downs Dec 2010

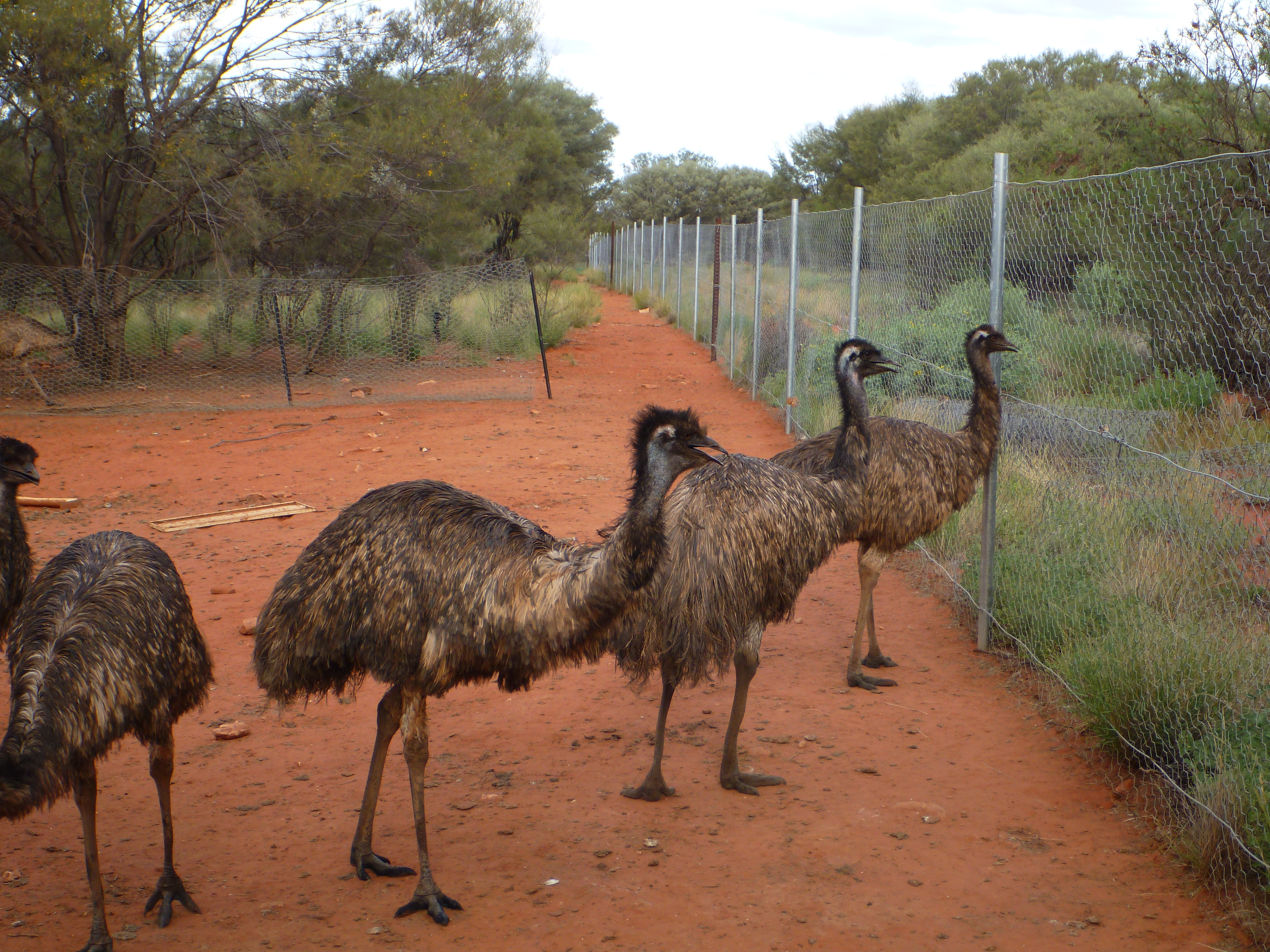
The baby emus all grown up on Angas Downs in March 2012 thanks to generous support from the Canberra Burley Griffin Rotary Club

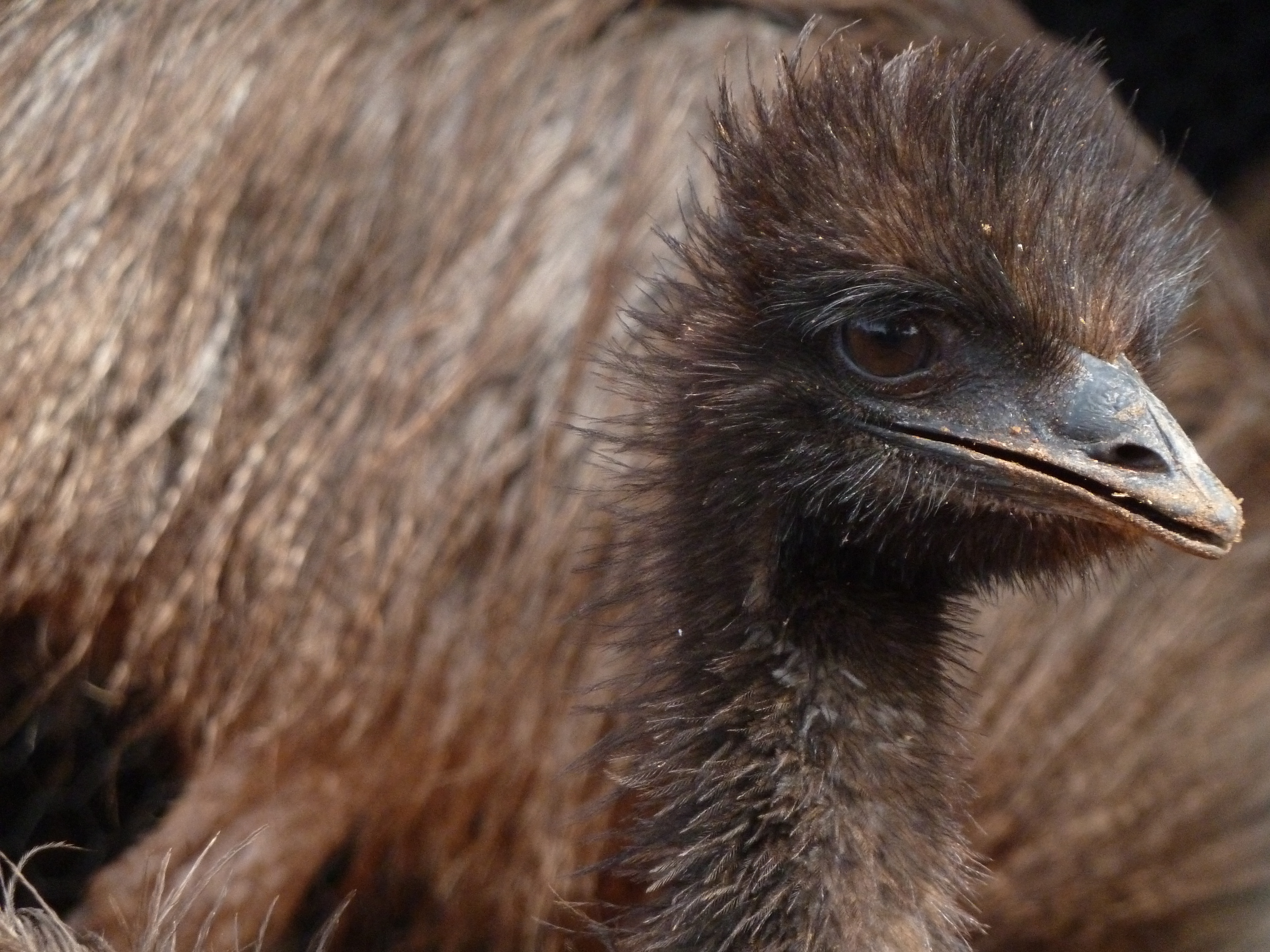
Emu in captivity on Angas Downs

== See also ==
- Protected areas of the Northern Territory
