= Kuka Kanyini =

Kuka Kanyini loosely means "looking after game animals" in the Australian Aboriginal Pitjantjatjara/Yankunytjatjara (APY) languages. In some of the most remote regions of Central Australia, Anangu Pitjantjatjara/Yankunytjatjara people manage their land and wildlife resources using a method that is loosely based on adaptive management plans which, in turn, are based on the Kuka Kanyini.

It sets out priorities for scientists to work with indigenous communities to help them manage their lands themselves. It is currently being implemented in the APY Lands, South Australia and on Angas Downs Indigenous Protected Area, Northern Territory.
