= CyberTracker =

Software for tracking animals

Cybertracker
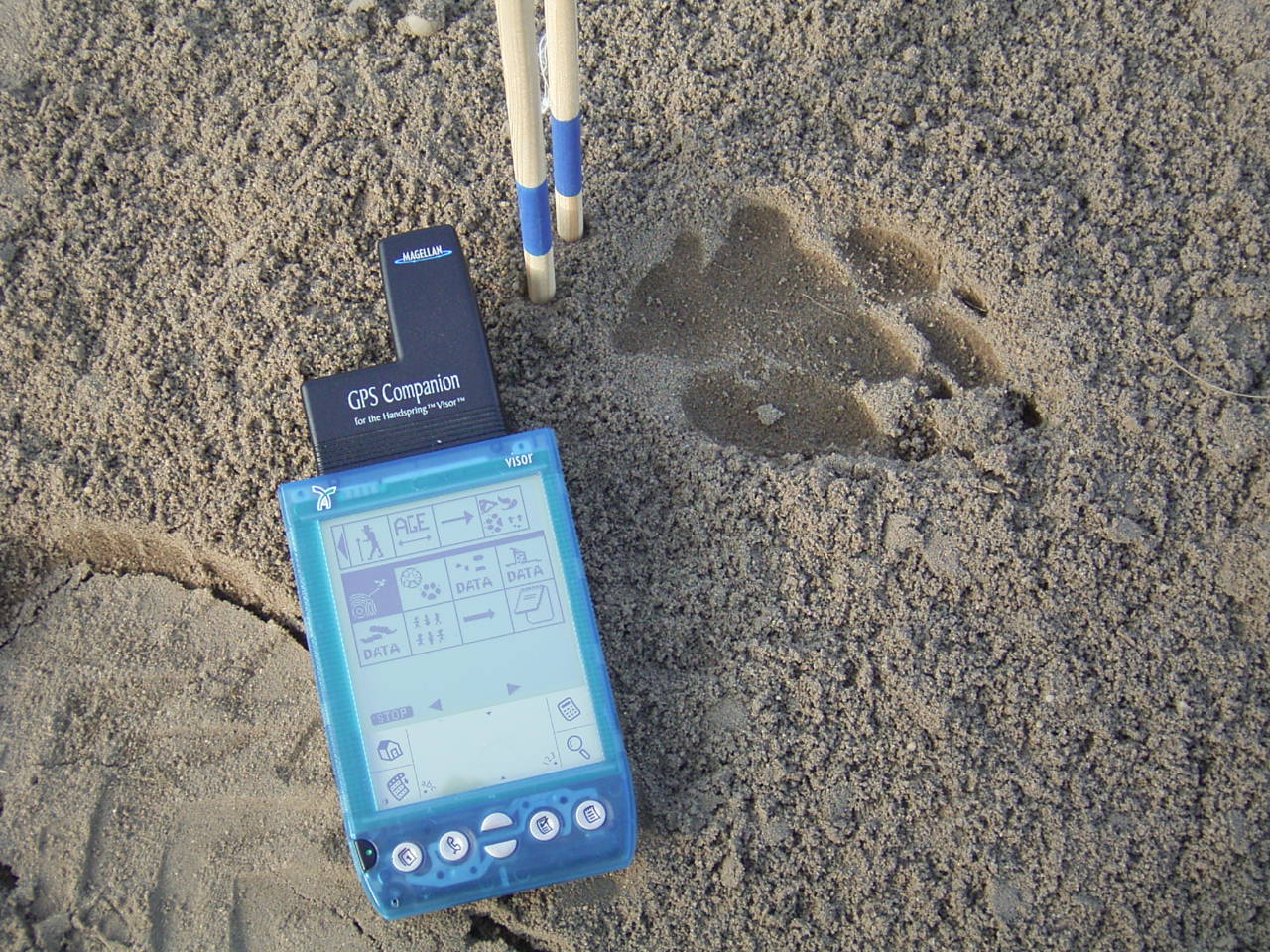
- Initial release: 1997
- Stable release: 3.3
- Website: http://cybertracker.org/

CyberTracker is software from a South African non-profit company, CyberTracker Conservation, that develops handheld data capture solutions.

The software was first developed as a way to allow illiterate animal trackers to communicate their environmental observations. A prototype was used in 2002 to record details of animals killed in an outbreak of ebola. It has since evolved to become a general purpose data capture and visualization system. However, it retains the ability to be used by illiterate and low-literate users.

CyberTracker's primary user base is wildlife biologists, conservationists and disaster relief workers.
