= Elizabeth Murchison =

British-Australian geneticist

- Awards: Philip Leverhulme Prize

Academic work
- Discipline: Genetics
- Sub-discipline: Comparative oncology
- Institutions: University of Cambridge

Elizabeth Murchison is a British-Australian geneticist, Professor of Comparative Oncology and Genetics at the University of Cambridge, UK. The ongoing research of her group focuses on the known existing clonally transmissible cancers arising in mammals. These are cancers that can be passed on between individuals by the transfer of living cancer cells that somehow manage to evade the immune system of their hosts.

There are two diseases which cause clonally transmissible cancers. One is the devil facial tumor disease (DFTD), which appeared a few decades ago. This disease could make the Tasmanian devil, a marsupial that lives on the Australian island of Tasmania, go extinct. The other disease is the much older Canine transmissible venereal tumor (CTVT), also known as Sticker sarcoma, a venereal tumor affecting dogs, which has spread worldwide.

Elizabeth Murchison and her collaborators have been analyzing the genome of these cancer cells. This has enabled them to show that CTVT must have emerged in a female dog more than 10000 years ago. The study of these two long-lived cancers also provides more general insight into the genetic evolution of cancer.

Elizabeth Murchison has received several awards for her research, such as the Philip Leverhulme Prize, the Cancer Research UK Future Leaders in Cancer Research Prize, the British Association for Cancer Research-AstraZeneca Young Scientist Frank Rose Award, the Genetics Society Balfour Prize Lecture (2014), and the Eppendorf Award for Young European Investigators (2012).

Elizabeth Murchison's 2011 TED talk titled "Fighting a contagious cancer" has been viewed more than 500,000 times.
