= Anne-Maree Pearse =

Australian cytogeneticist

- Education: University of Sydney University of Tasmania
- Known for: Devil facial tumour disease
- Awards: 2011 Australian Museum Eureka Prize 2012 Prince Hitachi Prize
- Scientific career
- Fields: Cytogenetics

Anne-Maree Pearse is an Australian cytogeneticist who is credited with the theory that some cancer cells can be transmissible between individuals. This is known as the allograft theory. Her work has focussed on devil facial tumour disease (DFTD), a contagious cancer that affects Tasmanian devils. For this she has won multiple awards, including the 2012 Prince Hitachi Prize for Comparative Oncology.

== Education ==
Pearse graduated from the University of Sydney in 1972 before starting an MSc at the University of Tasmania in 1976. During her Masters she worked on the flea, Uropsylla tasmanica, which is a flea that infects quolls and Tasmanian devils. She was unable to complete her PhD due to symptoms of progressive and severe degenerative disc disease.

== Career ==
Pearse worked in the Cytogenetics Laboratory at the Royal Hobart Hospital, Tasmania for seventeen years where she worked on human leukemia but also continued studying quolls. During this period she published work on cancer in quolls. She initially retired from scientific work, establishing a flower farm, before returning to science to work on DFTD. She joined the Save the Tasmanian Devil program at the Department of Primary Industries, Parks, Water and Environment, Tasmanian Government, in 2004 after hearing about the disease on the radio.

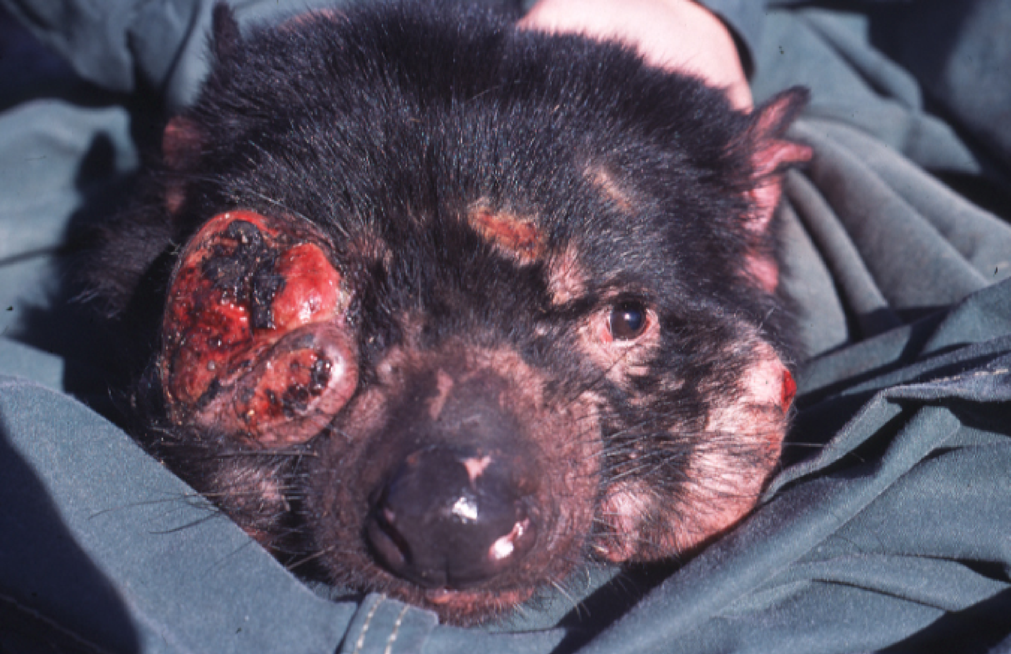
Tumours protrude from the face of a Tasmanian devil

In 2006, Pearse and her colleague Swift published a paper on their findings on DFTD in Nature. In their report they studied tumours from eleven Tasmanian devils. They observed that the tumours had major chromosomal abnormalities and these abnormalities were the same between individual animals. This led them to conclude that the tumour cells in different animals were of the same clonal origin. As a result, they proposed the hypothesis that "the disease is transmitted by allograft, whereby an infectious cell line is passed directly between the animals through bites they inflict on one another.".

Since then, other scientists have added further evidence to the Allograft Theory of DFTD whilst Pearse has continued to uncover new information on the disease. In particular, she has investigated how the disease mutates in Tasmanian Devil populations. The conclusion of this research is "that DFTD should not be treated as a static entity, but rather as an evolving parasite with epigenetic plasticity".

These findings have implications in humans in terms of donor-derived malignancy in organ transplantation and transmission of a malignancy between a mother and a fetus or between twin fetuses.

== Awards and honours ==
- 2011 Australian Museum Sherman Eureka Prize for Environmental Research (shared)
- 2012 Prince Hitachi Prize for Comparative Oncology
