= Contagious reticulum cell sarcoma =

Disease in Syrian hamsters

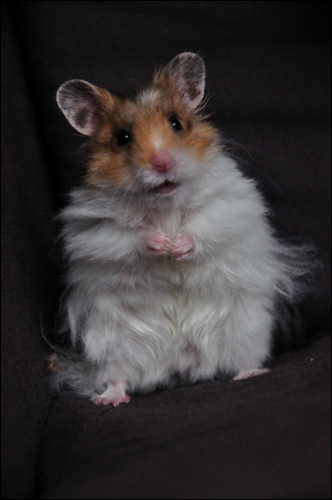
A Syrian hamster (Mesocricetus auratus)

Contagious reticulum cell sarcoma is a reticulum-cell sarcoma found in Syrian hamsters that can be transmitted from one hamster to another. It was first described in 1945.

Transmission from hamster to hamster can be through various mechanisms. It has been seen to spread within a laboratory population, presumably through gnawing at tumours and cannibalism. It can also be spread by means of the bite of the mosquito Aedes aegypti.

It is one of only three known transmissible cancers in mammals; the others are two independent strains of devil facial tumor disease, a cancer which occurs in Tasmanian devils, and canine transmissible venereal tumor in dogs and other canines. Both devil facial tumor disease and canine transmissible venereal tumor are believed to have a single origin, while contagious reticulum cell sarcoma tumours with multiple, independent origins have been observed in laboratory populations of hamsters.
