= Esocid lymphosarcoma =

Fish disease

Esocid lymphosarcoma, also known as Esox lymphosarcoma, is a transmissible tumor which affects two species of fish, northern pike (Esox lucius) and Muskellunge (Esox masquinongy), in North America and Europe. The tumors initially are found in the skin, but later in the course of the disease are also found in the internal organs. The tumors appear as colorless skin protrusions which are several centimeters in diameter. A retrovirus has been detected in affected cells by electron microscopy. The disease is spread by physical contact between fish, probably during the spring spawning season. The disease has the lowest prevalence in the summer.
