= Face cancer =

Face, or facial cancer may refer to:

- Head and neck cancer
  - Skin cancer in the face
- Devil facial tumour disease, in Tasmanian Devils
