= Eric Rowland Guiler =

Zoologist

Eric Rowland Guiler (born 1922 in Belfast; died 3 July 2008 in Hobart) was a Northern Irish-born Australian zoologist and academic. After serving in the British Army during World War II, he studied zoology at Queen’s University Belfast. In 1947, Guiler relocated to Australia to accept a position at the Zoology Department at the University of Tasmania. His academic career at the institution spanned more than three decades, during which he held successive positions as Lecturer (1948–1951), Senior Lecturer (1952–1973), and Reader (1974–1983).

Guiler became a leading authority on Tasmanian wildlife, having authored over 100 scientific papers. He was among the earliest researchers to systematically study the Tasmanian devil (Sarcophilus harrisii), a contribution later honored by the university through the establishment of a research grant in his name. Additionally, he was widely regarded as a leading expert on the thylacine (Thylacinus cynocephalus). Guiler authored and co-authored several books about the thylacine. He is also regarded as a pioneer of Australian wildlife research using camera traps.

In 1977, Guiler was awarded the Clive Lord Memorial Medal by the Royal Society of Tasmania. In 1980, he was appointed a Member of the Order of Australia.
