= George Prideaux Robert Harris =

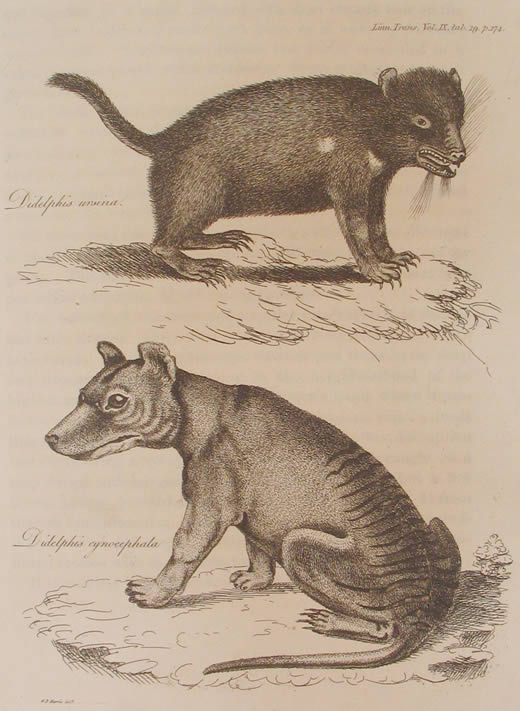
Didelphis ursina (top) and Didelphis cynocephala, engraving after a drawing by Harris.

George Prideaux Robert Harris (1775–1810) was the deputy surveyor in the early days of Van Diemen's Land (now Tasmania), Australia, from settlement in 1803 until his death in Hobart Town in 1810. He was also an explorer, artist and naturalist who described many of the plants and marsupials native to the Island, including the Tasmanian devil and the thylacine.
