= Uropsylla tasmanica =

- Adult female

Scientific classification
- Kingdom: Animalia
- Phylum: Arthropoda
- Clade: Pancrustacea
- Class: Insecta
- Order: Siphonaptera
- Family: Pygiopsyllidae
- Subfamily: Uropsyllinae
- Genus: Uropsylla
- Species: U. tasmanica

Binomial name
- Uropsylla tasmanica Rothschild, 1905

Species of flea

Uropsylla tasmanica is a species of flea in the insect order Siphonaptera endemic to Australia. It belongs to the subfamily Uropsyllinae that is placed in the family Pygiopsyllidae.

Uropsylla tasmanica occurs in Tasmania, New South Wales, Victoria, southern Western Australia, and southern Queensland. They are known to feed on marsupials, most notably dasyurid such as Tasmanian devils and quolls, and have been suggested to live on the now-extinct Tasmanian tiger.

Its lifecycle is unique among fleas — adults cement eggs to the hairs of host, then, once hatched, the larvae live subcutaneously, consuming subdermal host tissue. It is the only known flea with parasitic larvae.
