= International Thylacine Specimen Database =

Biodiversity database

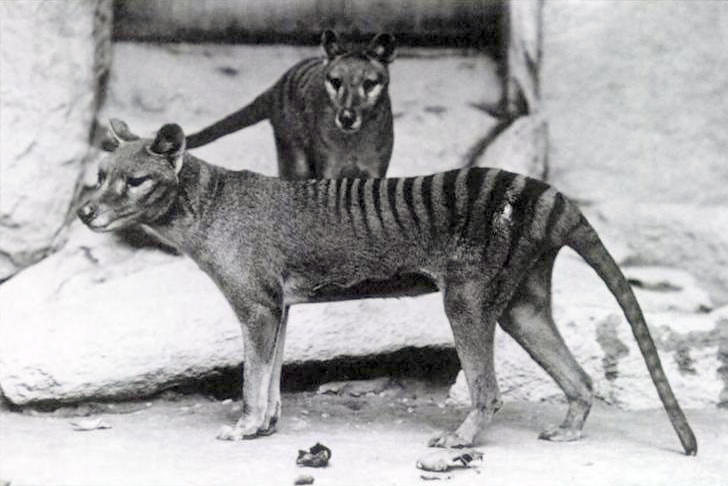
Thylacines in Washington D.C., c. 1904

The International Thylacine Specimen Database (ITSD) is the culmination of a four-year research project to catalogue and digitally photograph all known surviving specimen material of the thylacine (Thylacinus cynocephalus) (or Tasmanian tiger) held within museum, university, and private collections.

Certainly in my experience this is by far the most thorough compilation focused on an extinct or endangered animal ever produced and, as such, bound to be enormously useful to many generations of scientists to come.

— Prof. Mike Archer, Dean of Science - University of New South Wales

== History ==
The ITSD was first published as an electronic resource on a series of three CD-ROMs in April 2005. It was updated in July 2006 and completely revised in May 2009 and released on a single DVD totalling some 3.68 GB of data and images.

The ITSD has been designed as a free access academic tool to promote and facilitate undergraduate and postgraduate research into the species. It can be accessed through the offices of the curators and heads of department of the universities and museums that hold thylacine material or alternatively through the libraries of several of the major zoological societies.

The ITSD lists all available catalogue data for each individual specimen e.g. holding institution, catalogue identification number, sex, date of acquisition, specimen type, source, locality, collector, field number, old or additional catalogue numbers, purchase or exchange information and finally any additional remarks pertaining to the specimen.

== Goal ==
To support the data component and to significantly enhance its educational worth, high-resolution digital images of the specimens are included. The ITSD specimen image bank forms the largest single photographic resource of its kind anywhere in the world. The primary justification for including digital images was to:

1. Give researchers remote visual access to thylacine specimen material and to the accompanying data thus encouraging and promoting continued research into the species.
2. Conserve source specimen material from excessive handling hence directly contributing to its long-term conservation.
3. Assist with the security of source material in that a photographic record exists for all specimens within the database.
4. Preserve digital images of the specimens in their current state of preservation.

The data sets within the ITSD are supported by an image bank of around 2000 high-resolution digital photographs of the specimens themselves. All biological material deteriorates over time and these unique digital images will act as a permanent record of the specimens for future generations in their present state of preservation.

— Nicholas Ayliffe, principal photographer to the ITSD Project

== Materials held ==
Specimen material within the ITSD comprises skins, skeletons, skulls, taxidermy mounts and wet specimens. Wet specimens are whole animals, organs or body parts that have been preserved in either alcohol or formalin. Specimens of the thylacine are spread extensively around the globe so the search to locate these specimens was from the outset an international search involving a total of 106 museum, university and private collections in 23 countries.

The International Thylacine Specimen Database is a unique and precise database of the largest modern day marsupial carnivore. I am confident that all researchers will appreciate both its complexity and accuracy as a research tool. It is a wonderful resource and an extremely valuable part of Australia’s natural heritage.

— Heinz F. Moeller, former director of the Zoological Museum and Department of Comparative Morphology of Vertebrates, Heidelberg University, author of Der Beutelwolf

The master copy of the ITSD is held at the Zoological Society in London with mirror copies held within the university of Tasmania in Hobart, the Australian National Wildlife Collection in Canberra and the Queen Victoria Museum and Art Gallery in Launceston. The master and mirror copies are kept constantly revised and updated as new information comes to light. The Zoological Society was chosen to hold the master copy of the ITSD because of its historic association with the thylacine. The bulk of the early scientific papers on the species were published within its "Proceedings" and the society's zoo in Regent's Park exhibited more thylacines than any other zoo outside Australia.

== Honors and awards ==
Each year the Royal Zoological Society of New South Wales hosts the Whitley Awards. These awards are a tribute to Gilbert Whitley, the eminent Australian ichthyologist and are presented for outstanding publications that contain a significant amount of new information relating to the fauna of the Australasian region. In September 2005 the International Thylacine Specimen Database was awarded the Whitley Award for the best zoological database. This was the first time in the history of the awards that a Whitley citation had been presented for a database.
