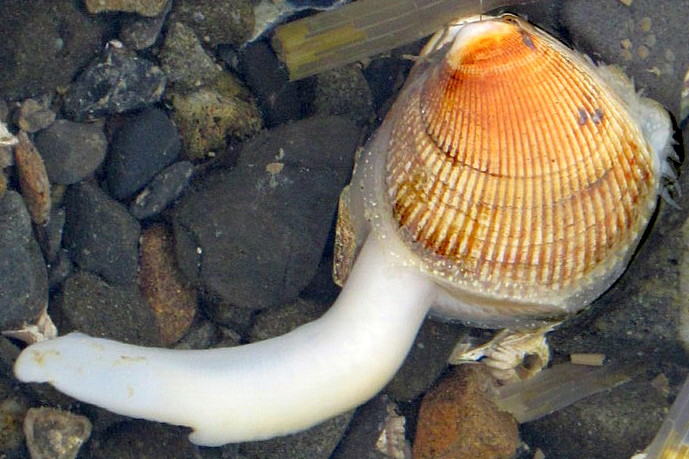

Scientific classification
- Kingdom: Animalia
- Phylum: Mollusca
- Class: Bivalvia
- Order: Cardiida
- Family: Cardiidae
- Genus: Clinocardium; Keen, 1936
- Species: C. nuttallii

Binomial name
- Clinocardium nuttallii (Conrad, 1837)

Synonyms
- Cardium californianum Conrad, 1837; Cardium corbis Martyn, 1784; Cardium nuttallii Conrad, 1837; Clinocardium ovalis Barinov, 1992; Laevicardium corbis (Martyn, 1784)

= Clinocardium =

Clinocardium nuttallii

Genus of bivalves

Clinocardium is a genus of marine bivalve molluscs in the family Cardiidae, the cockles. This genera mainly contains extinct members, only being represented by the single living species Clinocardium nuttallii, also known as the basket cockle, heart cockle, or Nuttall's cockle, a large edible saltwater clam. This species was originally described in the genus Cardium, with the species name being after zoologist, Thomas Nuttall, in 1837, with the type locality being from the Columbia River estuary in Oregon. Cardium was eventually split into multiple genera, where C. nuttallii was moved to its current genera Clinocardium in 1936. This species also has a history in the fossil record with its earliest known appearance being from Asagai Formation from the Oligocene in Fukushima, Japan. Fossils have so far been uncovered in the United States (California, Oregon, Washington, Alaska), Japan (Fukushima, Hokkaido), Russia (Sakhalin Oblast, Kamchatka Peninsula), and Canada (British Colombia).

== Description ==
C. nuttallii can grow to sizes of 7.2 cm - 14 cm, with more northern individuals growing to larger sizes. Shells have mottled patterning with colorations of brown when young, before typically growing into a yellow or light brown coloration in adulthood. The shells are bilaterally symmetrical, with a rounded triangular shape of the valves and a heart-like shape when viewed from the ends with both valves in view. Shells also have an average of 34 ribs radiating through each valve with growth lines spanning through. Tiny eyes are present on tentacles that extend from the mantle margin.

C. nuttallii has a lifespan of up to 16 years, with sexual maturity being reached at 2 years of age. Annual spawning occurs in different months of spring and fall depending on the location of populations, with California and Oregon having a spawning season from June to October, whereas Washington through Alaska has a spawning season from July to August. This species is hermaphroditic.

== Ecology ==
C. nuttallii is native to the coastlines of North America, this species can be found spanning from western Alaska in the Bering Sea to Southern California. They have also been found on the island Hokkaido. This species mainly lives in intertidal areas with soft fine sediment made up of either sand, gravel, and cobble, throughout coastal beaches, eelgrass beds, and mudflats. Eelgrass and mudflat areas are also known to host a larger population of these clams. They can also be found offshore up to depths of 200 meters in sandy areas. In this environment individuals burry themselves up to 6 cm, where suspension feeding is done through extending their siphons out of the substrate to feed on small, planktonic organic matter.

Predators of C. nuttallii includes species equipped to prey on bivalves which includes members of marine mammals, crabs, fishes, sea stars, cephalopods, and coastal birds. Specific exampled species include sea otters, sunflower sea stars, giant pacific octopuses, dungeness crabs, and black oystercatchers. In the event of predation, especially from sea stars, these clams will use their muscular foot to move themselves away as an escape method.

Small individuals are found to host small crabs such as young Pinnixa faba and Pinnixa littoralis that live within the clam's mantle. Individuals over 2 years in age are also found to house Chlorella algae within the siphon, mantle, and foot. These algae sometimes form large dense colonies inside the clams, though these algae do not cause any reactions or harm in the host.

== Usage ==
and has been used by the indigenous peoples of California and the Pacific Northwest as food.

== Disease ==
The species suffers from a transmissible cancer, which has a significant economic impact.
