= Nick Mooney =

Australian conservationist (born 1953)

Nick Mooney (born 23 December 1953) is an Australian conservationist, biologist, writer, wildlife expert, and ecological educator best known for his work with the Tasmanian devil. In addition to efforts to learn about the diseases facing and threatening the Devil population, Mooney educates area farmers about the benefits they provide.

In addition to his work with the Tasmanian Devil he is also involved with government efforts related to the search for the elusive, and some believe extinct, Tasmanian tiger, and efforts to prevent foxes from destroying Tasmania's ecosystem. In 2006 Mooney received a Local Hero award as Australian of the Year
