= Canine transmissible venereal tumor =

Disease in dogs and other canines

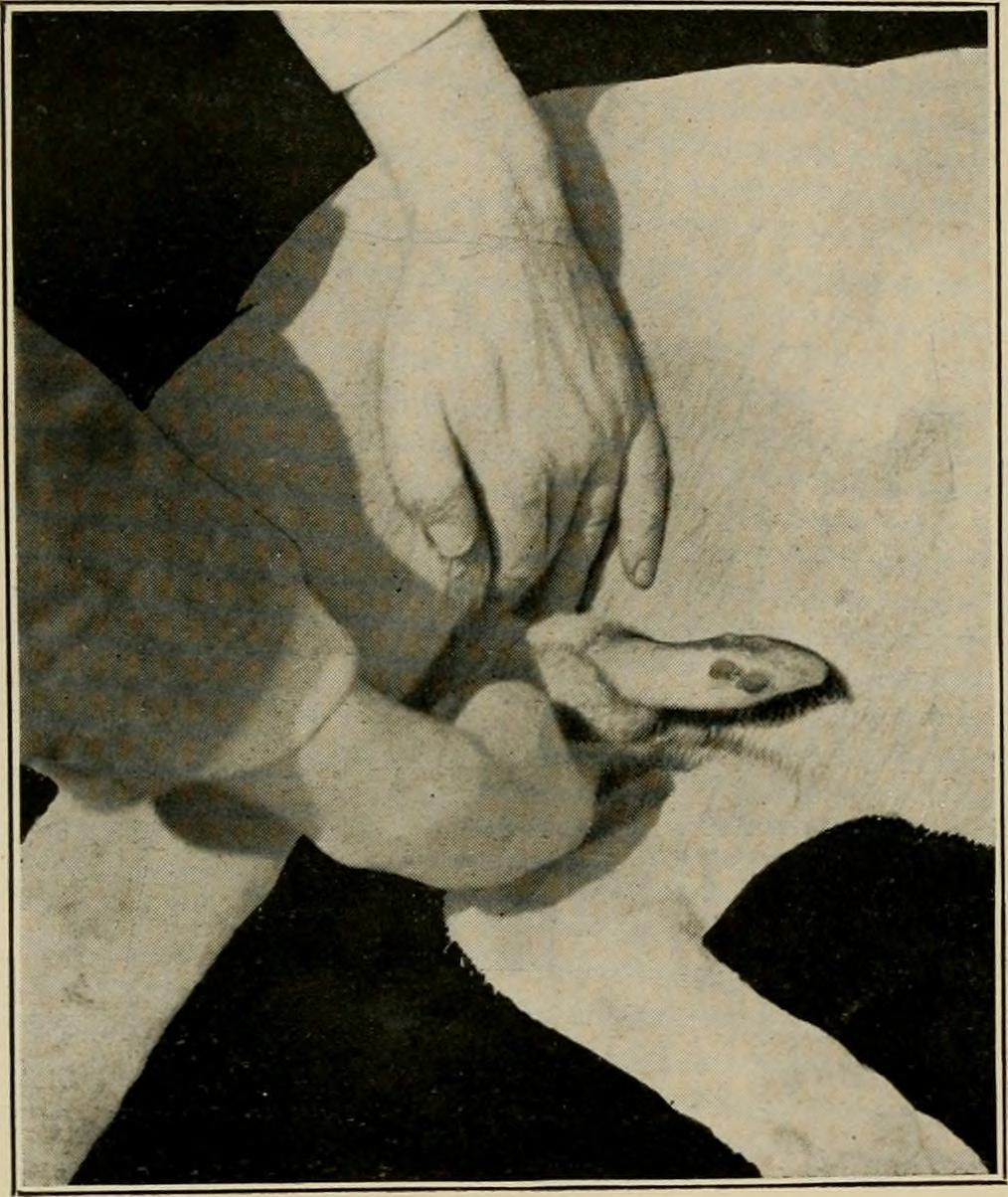
Venereal granulomata on a dog's penis

A canine transmissible venereal tumor (CTVT), also known as a transmissible venereal tumor (TVT), canine transmissible venereal sarcoma (CTVS), sticker tumor or infectious sarcoma, is a histiocytic tumor of the external genitalia of domestic dogs and other canines, and is transmitted from animal to animal during mating. It is one of only three known transmissible cancers in mammals; the others are devil facial tumor disease, a cancer which occurs in Tasmanian devils, and contagious reticulum cell sarcoma of the Syrian hamster.

The tumor cells are themselves the infectious agents, and the tumors that form are not genetically related to the host dog. Although the genome of a CTVT is derived from an individual canid (specifically from a population of Native American dogs with coyote contribution), it is now essentially living as a unicellular, asexually reproducing (but sexually transmitted) pathogen. Sequence analysis of the genome suggests it diverged over 6,000 years ago; possibly much earlier. Estimates from 2015 date its time of origin to about 11,000 years ago. However, the most recent common ancestor of extant tumors is more recent: it probably originated 200 to 2,500 years ago.

Canine TVTs were initially reported by veterinary practitioner Delabere P. Blaine in London in 1810. In 1876, Russian veterinarian Mstislav A. Novinsky (1841–1914) demonstrated that the tumor could be transplanted from one dog to another by infecting them with tumor cells.

== Signs and symptoms ==
In male dogs, the tumor affects the penis and sheath. In female dogs, it affects the vulva. Rarely, the mouth or nose are affected. The tumor often has a cauliflower-like appearance. Signs of genital TVT include a discharge from the prepuce and in some cases urinary retention caused by blockage of the urethra. Signs of a nasal TVT include nasal fistulae, nosebleeds and other nasal discharge, facial swelling, and enlargement of the submandibular lymph nodes.

== Pathology ==
Canine transmissible venereal tumors are histiocytic tumors that may be transmitted among dogs through coitus, licking, biting and sniffing tumor affected areas. The concept that the tumor is naturally transmissible as an allograft came from three important observations. First, CTVTs can only be experimentally induced by transplanting living tumor cells, and not by killed cells or cell filtrates. Second, the tumor karyotype is aneuploid but has characteristic marker chromosomes in all tumors collected in different geographic regions. Third, a long interspersed nuclear element (LINE-1) insertion near the c-myc gene has been found in all tumors examined so far and can be used as a diagnostic marker to confirm that a tumor is a CTVT.

Canine transmissible venereal tumors are most commonly seen in sexually active dogs in tropical, subtropical and temperate climates where there are large populations of stray dogs, but little is known about the details of transmission. The disease is spread when dogs mate, and can even be transmitted to other canine species, such as foxes and coyotes. Spontaneous regression of the tumor can occur, probably due to a response from the immune system. CTVT undergoes a predictable cycle: an initial growth phase of four to six months (P phase), a stable phase, and a regression phase (R phase), although not all CTVTs will regress. The tumor does not often metastasize (occurring in about less than 5 percent of cases), except in puppies and immunocompromised dogs. Metastasis occurs to regional lymph nodes, but can also be seen in the skin, brain, eye, liver, spleen, testicle, rectum and muscle. A biopsy is necessary for diagnosis.

The success of this single cell lineage, believed to be the longest continually propagated cell lineage in the world, can be attributed to the tumor's mode of transmission in a specific host system. Although direct contact is generally not a highly efficient mode of transfer, CTVTs take advantage of the popular sire effect of domestic dogs. A single male can produce dozens of litters over his lifetime, allowing the tumor to affect many more females than it could if a monogamous species were the host. Understanding the epidemiology of CTVTs could provide insights for populations that may experience CTVT exposure and information about disease prevalence.

=== Genetics ===
The CTVT cells have fewer chromosomes than normal dog cells. Dog cells normally have 78 chromosomes, while the cancer cells contain 57–64 chromosomes that are very different in appearance from normal dog chromosomes. All dog chromosomes except X and Y are acrocentric, having a centromere very near to the end of the chromosome, while many of the CTVT chromosomes are metacentric or submetacentric, having a centromere nearer to the middle.

All tumor cells of this type of cancer share extremely similar genetic code, often if not always unrelated to the DNA of their host. In addition to the aforementioned c-myc insertion, a few other potential driver mutations have been identified.

=== Treatment method ===
The tumor, when treated with the chemotherapy drug vincristine, regresses as the host immune system is activated. CCL5 may play an important role in the immune response.

== Treatment ==
Surgery may be difficult due to the location of these tumors. Surgery alone often leads to recurrence. Chemotherapy is very effective for TVTs. The prognosis for complete remission with chemotherapy is excellent. The most common chemotherapy agents used are vincristine, vinblastine, and doxorubicin. Use of autohaemotherapy in treatment of TVTs also showed promising results in many cases. Radiotherapy may be required if chemotherapy does not work.

== See also ==
- Henneguya zschokkei, a free-living microorganism also thought to have originated from cancer afflicting an individual animal, in this case a cnidarian.
