= Clonally transmissible cancer =

Cancer capable of infecting other individuals

A transmissible cancer is a cancer cell or cluster of cancer cells that can be transferred between individuals without the involvement of an infectious agent such as an oncovirus. The evolution of transmissible cancer has occurred naturally in other animal species, but human cancer transmission is rare. This transfer is typically between members of the same species or closely related species.

== General mechanism ==
Transmissible cancers require a specific combination of related circumstances to occur. These conditions involve both the host species and the tumors being transferred. These typically include low genetic diversity among individuals, an effective physical and environmental transport system, and a high enough dose of infective material. The cancers that reproduce faster in larger quantities with different means of reproduction tend to be favored for transmission if host conditions are met. Transmissible cancers follow the general pattern of cancer spread, starting with the growth of primary cancer cells at tumor sites followed by invasion of surrounding tissue and subsequent spread throughout the organism. The main hurdles for surviving cells of a successful spread to a new host are histocompatibility barriers. The cancers have to bypass the self recognition system, survive the difference in nutrients and induce the correct response in the new hosts to begin the cycle anew.

Transmissible cancers behave as true parasites, relying primarily on transport systems like direct contact, environmental transport and vectors, rather than hematogenous and lymphatic carriers to spread between organisms. The amount of shedded cancer cells from initial host has to be high enough to increase survival probability. Direct contact transmissions through sexual or general contact such as in DFTD and CTVT ensures a higher potential for transmission. Population factors also play an important role. A dense population of available and uninfected potential hosts is ideal for the tumors given the complexity and difficulty of the overall process, hence its virulence and potency must be adequately controlled.

== Humans ==
In humans, a significant fraction of Kaposi's sarcoma occurring after transplantation may be due to tumorous outgrowth of donor cells. Although Kaposi's sarcoma is caused by a virus (Kaposi's sarcoma-associated herpesvirus), in these cases, it appears likely that transmission of virus-infected tumor cells—rather than the free virus—caused tumors in the transplant recipients.

In 2007, four people (three women and one man) received different organ transplants (liver, both lungs and kidneys) from a 53-year-old woman who had recently died from intracranial bleeding. Before transplantation, the organ donor was deemed to have no signs of cancer upon medical examination. The organ recipients developed metastatic breast cancer from the organs and three of them died from the cancer between 2009–2017.

In 2014, a case of parasite-to-host cancer transmission occurred in a 41-year-old man in Colombia with a compromised immune system due to HIV. The man's tumor cells were shown to have originated from the dwarf tapeworm, Hymenolepis nana. In the 1990s, an undifferentiated pleomorphic sarcoma was transmitted from a 32-year-old patient to his 53-year-old surgeon when the surgeon injured his hand during an operation. Within five months, a tumor had developed on the hand of the surgeon and was subsequently excised. Histologic examinations of the tumor tissues from the patient and surgeon showed that both were morphologically identical. In 1986, a 19-year-old laboratory worker mistakenly punctured her hand with a needle previously used to extract human colonic cancer cells. No injection of the substance occurred, and the worker suffered a small puncture wound with bleeding. Within 19 days, she had developed a small cancerous nodule on her hand. The tumor was removed soon after, and showed no sign of subsequent reoccurrence.

== Other animals ==
Contagious cancers are known to occur in dogs, Tasmanian devils, Syrian hamsters, bullhead catfish, and some marine bivalves including soft-shell clams. These cancers have a relatively stable genome as they are transmitted. Recent studies have tested whether other highly prevalent wildlife cancers, such as urogenital carcinomas in Californian sea lions, could also be contagious but so far there is no evidence for this.

Clonally transmissible cancer, caused by a clone of malignant cells rather than a virus, is an extremely rare disease modality, with few transmissible cancers being known. The evolution of transmissible cancer is unlikely, because the cell clone must be adapted to survive a physical transmission of living cells between hosts, and must be able to survive in the environment of a new host's immune system. Animals that have undergone population bottlenecks may be at greater risks of contracting transmissible cancers due to a lack of overall genetic diversity. Infectious cancers may also evolve to circumvent immune response by means of natural selection in order to spread. Because of their transmission, it was initially thought that these diseases were caused by the transfer of oncoviruses, in the manner of cervical cancer caused by human papillomavirus. However, canine transmissible venereal tumor mutes the expression of the immune response, whereas the Syrian hamster disease spreads due to lack of genetic diversity.

=== Canine transmissible venereal tumor ===
Canine transmissible venereal tumor (CTVT) is sexually transmitted cancer which induces cancerous tumors on the genitalia of both male and female dogs, typically during mating. It was first described medically by a veterinary practitioner in London in 1810. It was experimentally transplanted between dogs in 1876 by M. A. Novinsky (1841–1914). A single malignant clone of CTVT cells has colonized dogs worldwide, representing the oldest known malignant cell line in continuous propagation, a fact that was uncovered in 2006. Researchers deduced that the CTVT went through 2 million mutations to reach its actual state, and inferred it started to develop in ancient dog species 11,000 years ago.

=== Contagious reticulum cell sarcoma ===
Contagious reticulum cell sarcoma of the Syrian hamster can be transmitted from one Syrian hamster to another through various mechanisms. It has been seen to spread within a laboratory population, presumably through gnawing at tumours and cannibalism. It can also be spread by means of the bite of the mosquito Aedes aegypti.

=== Devil facial tumour disease ===
Devil facial tumour disease (DFTD) is a transmissible parasitic cancer in the Tasmanian devil. Since its discovery in 1996, DFTD has spread and infected 4/5 of all Tasmanian devils and threatens them with extinction. DFTD has a near 100% fatality rate, and has killed up to 90% of Tasmanian devil populations living in some reserves. A new DFTD tumor-type cancer was recently uncovered on 5 Tasmanian devils (DFT2), histologically different from DFT1, leading researchers to believe that the Tasmanian devil "is particularly prone to the emergence of transmissible cancers".

=== Brown bullhead catfish melanoma ===
A clonally transmissible melanoma was identified in 2026 among brown bullhead catfish in Lake Memphremagog. It appears to have spread rapidly, affecting over 30% of individuals in the lake in 2015 after not being present in notable levels in 2012. It is currently unknown how it has affected bullhead populations or how long it has diverged from normal bullhead populations, but melanomas among brown bullheads have been known since at least 1925.

=== Bivalves ===
Soft-shell clams, Mya arenaria, have been found to be vulnerable to a transmissible neoplasm of the hemolymphatic system — effectively, leukemia. The cells have infected clam beds hundreds of miles from each other, making this clonally transmissible cancer the only one that does not require contact for transmission.

Horizontally transmitted cancers have also been discovered in several other species of marine bivalves: bay mussels (Mytilus trossulus), common cockles (Cerastoderma edule) and golden carpet shell clams (Polititapes aureus). The golden carpet shell clam cancer was found to have been transmitted from another species, the pullet carpet shell (Venerupis corrugata). Clinocardium also suffers from a transmissible cancer, which has a significant economic impact.

== See also ==
- Allotransplantation
- Anne-Maree Pearse, originator of the allograft theory of transmissible cancer
- Myxosporea – SCANDAL hypothesis
