= Devil facial tumour disease =

Cancer affecting Tasmanian devils

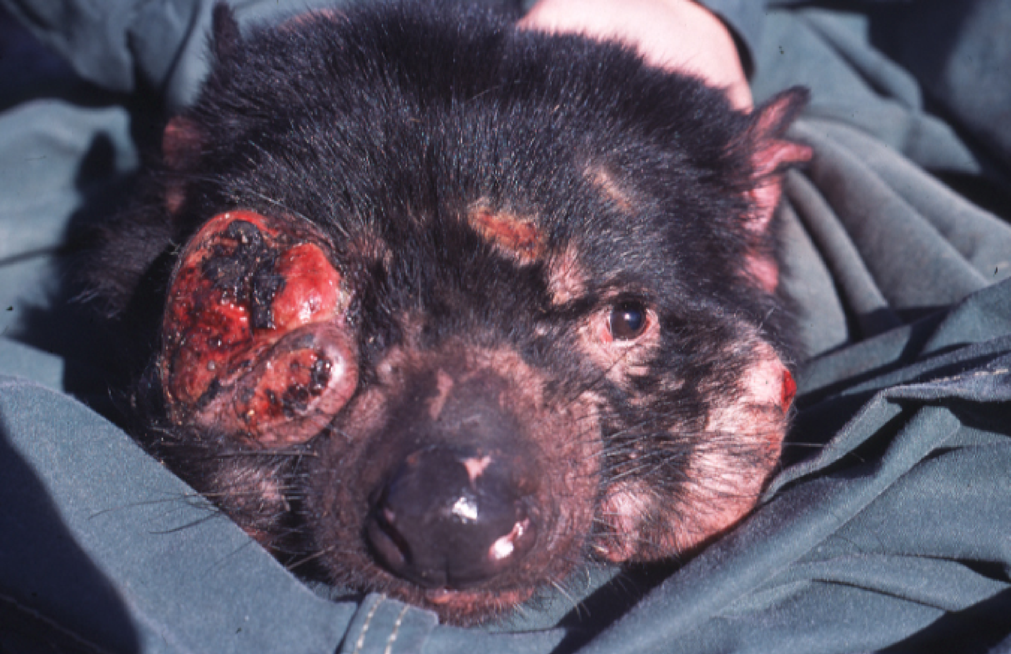
Devil facial tumour disease causes tumours to form in and around the mouth.

Devil facial tumour disease (DFTD) is an aggressive non-viral clonally transmissible cancer which affects Tasmanian devils, a marsupial native to the Australian island of Tasmania. The cancer manifests itself as lumps of soft and ulcerating tissue around the mouth, which may invade surrounding organs and metastasise to other parts of the body. Severe genetic abnormalities exist in cancer cells—for example, DFT2 cells are tetraploid, containing twice as much genetic material as normal cells. DFTD is most often spread by bites, when teeth come into contact with cancer cells; less important pathways of transmission are ingesting of infected carcasses and sharing of food. Adult Tasmanian devils who are otherwise the fittest are most susceptible to the disease.

DFTD is estimated to have first developed in 1986. There are two currently existing strains, both appearing to be derived from Schwann cells. DFT1 is the main and older strain that infects most of the devil population. It was first described in 1996 in an animal from Mount William National Park in northeastern Tasmania. DFT2 appeared around 2011 and was first detected in 2014; all cases are limited to the area of southern Tasmania near the D'Entrecasteaux Channel. There still remain disease-free pockets in the relatively isolated south-west of the island.

The disease poses a direct threat to the survival of Tasmanian devils as a species as the disease is almost universally fatal. In the two decades since the disease was first spotted, population of Devils (Sarcophilus harrisii) declined by 80% (locally exceeding 90%), as the condition spread through virtually all of Tasmania. The Tasmanian Government, Australian universities and zoos are engaged in efforts to curb the disease. Culling infected individuals, the policy used by state officials until 2010, brought little success. Thus the main prevention method became taking hundreds of devils into captivity and then releasing some of them into the wild. There is no cure for the cancer so far. Vaccination offers some promise in the fight against the pathogen, but researchers have not found a suitable candidate yet. A 2017 vaccine trial found that only 1 in 5 devils could resist DFTD; a DFT1 oral vaccine candidate is being tested in the captive devil population.

== Clinical signs ==
There is often more than one primary tumour. Visible signs of DFTD begin with lumps of soft tissue around the mouth, which ulcerate. Tumours are locally aggressive, destroying the underlying bone of the jaw which interferes with feeding. Tumours may also cover the eyes. Devils usually die within six months from organ failure, secondary infection, or metabolic starvation.

DFTD is rare in juveniles. It affects males and females equally.

== Transmission ==
The most plausible route of transmission is through biting, particularly when canine teeth come into direct contact with the diseased cells. Other modes of transmission may include the ingestion of infected carcasses and the sharing of food, both of which involve an allogeneic transfer of cells between unrelated individuals. The animals most likely to become infected are the fittest devil individuals.

== Pathology ==
DFTD tumours are large soft tissue masses which become centrally ulcerated. The tumours are composed of lobules of nodules of round to spindle-shaped cells, often within a pseudocapsule. Tumours metastasise to regional lymph nodes involvement and systemically to the lungs, spleen and heart.

== Tumour characteristics ==
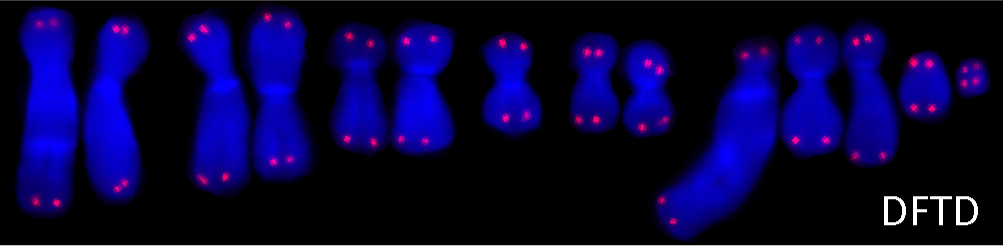
Karyotype of DFTD

Tasmanian devil cells have 14 chromosomes; the oldest-known strain of the tumour cells have thirteen chromosomes, nine of which are recognisable and four of which are mutated "marker" chromosomes. More recently evolved strains have an additional mutant marker chromosome, for a total of fourteen chromosomes. Researchers identified the cancer as a neuroendocrine tumour, and found identical chromosomal rearrangements in all the cancer cells. The karyotype anomalies of DFTD cells are similar to those of cancer cells from canine transmissible venereal tumour (CTVT), a cancer of dogs that is transmitted by physical contact. Among the mutations present in the tumour genome are trisomy in chromosome 5p, as well as several single base mutations, and short insertions and deletions, e.g., deletions in the chromosomes 1, 2 and 3. Some of the mutated or deleted genes in DFTD are RET, FANCD2, MAST3 and BTNL9-like gene.

Classical DFTD likely originated in the Schwann cells of a single devil. Schwann cells are found in the peripheral nervous system, and produce myelin and other proteins essential for the functions of nerve cells in the peripheral nervous system. Researchers sampled 25 tumours and found that the tumours were genetically identical. Using deep sequencing technology, the study authors then profiled the tumours' transcriptome, the set of genes that are active in tumours; the transcriptomes closely matched those of Schwann cells, revealing high activity in many of the genes coding for myelin basic protein production. Several specific markers were identified, including the MBP and PRX genes, which may enable veterinarians to more easily distinguish DFTD from other types of cancer, and may eventually help identify a genetic pathway that can be targeted to treat it.

In 2015, a second genetically distinct strain of DFTD was identified, which was tetraploid, not diploid like the main form of the cancer. The tetraploid form has been linked to lower mortality rates. The cell type origin of this strain of DFTD is unknown. Increased levels of tetraploidy have been shown to exist in the oldest strain of DFTD as of 2014, which correlates with the point at which devils became involved in a DFTD removal programme. Because ploidy slows the tumour growth rate, the DFTD removal programme has been suggested as a selective pressure favouring slower-growing tumours, and more generally that disease eradication programmes aimed at DFTD may encourage the evolution of DFTD. The existence of multiple strains may complicate attempts to develop a vaccine, and there are reports of concerns that the evolution of the cancer may allow it to spread to related species such as the quoll.

In 2023 both DFTD strains were sequenced in a family tree indicating that the main strain DFT1 emerged around 1986 while DFT2 arose around 2011 and is found in only a small region of the island but it mutates around three times faster.

== Preservation response ==
Wild Tasmanian devil populations are being monitored to track the spread of the disease and to identify changes in disease prevalence. Field monitoring involves trapping devils within a defined area to check for the presence of the disease and determine the number of affected animals. The same area is visited repeatedly to characterise the spread of the disease over time. So far, it has been established that the short-term effects of the disease in an area can be severe. Long-term monitoring at replicated sites will be essential to assess whether these effects remain, or whether populations can recover. Field workers are also testing the effectiveness of disease suppression by trapping and removing diseased devils, with the expectation that removal of diseased devils from wild populations would decrease disease prevalence, allowing devils to survive beyond juvenile years and so to breed. One study reported that a system of culling prior to 2010 did not impede disease spread.

A plan to create "insurance populations" of disease-free devils has been ongoing since 2005. As of June 2012, the insurance population has reached a combined total of 500 animals and representing over 98% of the genetic diversity of this species. Most of these devils are living in Australian zoos and wildlife reserves. Beginning in November 2012, however, in an effort to create a population that is both wild and disease-free, Tasmanian devils have been relocated to Maria Island, a mountainous island off the east coast of Tasmania. The Maria Island population has grown from a starting population of twenty-eight to 90, and experts will soon begin transferring healthy devils back to the mainland population. A study on the survival rates of the Maria Island population found that in contrast to other carnivores raised in captivity, the Tasmanian devils were not adversely affected by being born in captivity when released on Maria Island.

Due to the decreased life expectancy of the devils with DFTD, affected individuals have begun breeding at younger ages in the wild, with reports that many only live to participate in one breeding cycle. Hence, Tasmanian devils appear to have changed breeding habits in response to the disease; females had previously begun to breed annually at age two, for about three more years, dying thereafter of a variety of causes. Populations are now characterised by onset of breeding at age one, dying of DFTD, on average, shortly thereafter. Social interactions have been seen to contribute to spread of DFTD in a local area.

The decline in devil numbers is also an ecological problem, since its presence in the Tasmanian forest ecosystem is believed to have prevented the establishment of the red fox, with the most recent known organism accidentally being introduced into Tasmania in 1998. Tasmanian devil young may now be more vulnerable to red fox predation, as pups are left alone for long periods of time.

In response to the impact of DFTD on Tasmanian devil populations, 47 devils have been shipped to mainland Australian wildlife parks to attempt to preserve the genetic diversity of the species. The largest of these efforts is the Devil Ark project in Barrington Tops, New South Wales; an initiative of the Australian Reptile Park. This project aims to create a set of one thousand genetically representative devils, and is now a major focus of the insurance policy.

In August 2023, the Devil Ark at Barrington celebrated the birth of the 500th devil since the project was launched.

The Tasman peninsula is being considered as a possible "clean area" with the single narrow access point controlled by physical barriers. The Tasmanian Department of Primary Industries and Water is experimenting on culling infected animals with some signs of success.

A diagnostic blood test was developed in mid-2009 to screen for the disease. In early 2010, scientists found some Tasmanian devils, mostly in the north-west of Tasmania, that are genetically different enough for their bodies to recognise the cancer as foreign. They have only one major histocompatibility complex, whereas the cancerous cells have both.

Oocyte banking may be useful in the conservation effort for Tasmanian devils, as the survival rate of cryopreserved oocytes is 70%.

== History ==
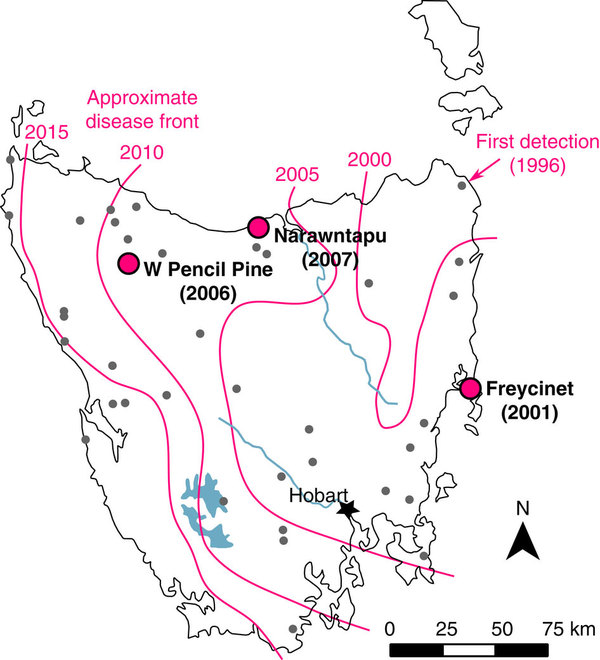
Spread of the disease as of 2015

In 1996, a photographer from The Netherlands captured several images of devils with facial tumours near Mount William in Tasmania's northeast. Around the same time, farmers reported a decline in devil numbers. Menna Jones first encountered the disease in 1999 near Little Swanport, in 2001 capturing three devils with facial tumours on the Freycinet Peninsula.

The theory that cancer cells themselves could be an infective agent (the Allograft Theory) was first offered in 2006 by Pearse, Swift and colleagues, who analysed DFTD cells from devils in several locations, determining that all DFTD cells sampled were genetically identical to each other, and genetically distinct from their hosts and from all other individual Tasmanian devils whose genetics had been studied; this allowed them to conclude that the cancer originated from a single individual and spread from it, rather than arising repeatedly, and independently. Twenty-one different subtypes have been identified by analysing the mitochondrial and nuclear genomes of 104 tumours from different Tasmanian devils. Researchers have also witnessed a previously uninfected devil develop tumours from lesions caused by an infected devil's bites, supporting the contention that the disease is spread by allograft, with transmission via biting, scratching, and aggressive sexual activity between individuals. During biting, infection can spread from the bitten devil to the biter.

Initially, it was suspected that devils had low genetic diversity, so that their immune system did not recognise the tumour cells as foreign. However, it was later demonstrated that devils are sufficiently genetically diverse to mount a strong immune response to foreign tissue.

Since June 2005, three females have been found that are partially resistant to DFTD.

The devil population on the peninsula decreased dramatically. In March 2003 Nick Mooney wrote a memo to be circulated within the Parks and Wildlife Services calling for more funding to study the disease, but the call for funding was edited out before the memo was presented to Bryan Green, then Tasmania's Minister for Primary Industries, Water and Environment. In April 2003, a working group was formed by the Tasmanian Government to respond to the disease. In September 2003, Nick Mooney went to the Tasmanian daily newspaper The Mercury, informing the general public of the disease and proposing a quarantine of healthy Tasmanian devils. At the time, it was thought that a retrovirus was a possible cause. David Chadwick of the state Animal Health Laboratory said that the laboratory did not have the resources needed to research the possibility of a retrovirus. The Tasmanian Conservation Trust criticised the Tasmanian government for providing insufficient funds for research and suggested that DFTD could be zoonotic, posing a threat to livestock and humans. On 14 October 2003, a workshop was held in Launceston. In 2004, Kathryn Medlock found three oddly shaped devil skulls in European museums and found a description of a devil in London Zoo dying, which showed a similarity to DFTD.

Calicivirus, 1080 poison, agricultural chemicals, and habitat fragmentation combined with a retrovirus were other proposed causes. Environmental toxins had also been suspected. In March 2006 a devil escaped from a park into an area infected with DFTD. She was recaptured with bite marks on her face, and returned to live with the other devils in the park. She wounded a male and by October both devils had DFTD, which was subsequently spread to two others (an incident that in retrospect would be understood in the context of the allograft theory of transmission).

In 2006, DFTD was classed a List B notifiable disease under the Government of Tasmania's Animal Health Act 1995. The strategy of developing an insurance population in captivity was developed. It was reassessed in 2008. A 2007 investigation into the immune system of the devils found that when combatting other pathogens, the response from the immune system was normal, leading to suspicion that the devils were not capable of detecting the cancerous cells as "non-self". In 2007, it was predicted that populations could become locally extinct within 10–15 years of DFTD occurring, and predicted that the disease would spread across the entire range of the Tasmanian devils causing the devils to become extinct within 25–35 years.

As of 2016, devils were endangered as the localised populations were shown to have declined by 90 per cent and an overall species decline of more than 80 per cent in less than 20 years, with some models predicting extinction. Despite this, devil populations persist in disease-stricken areas. The devils have, in a way, fought back the extinction by developing the gene that is immune to face tumors. The genes have already existed in the Tasmanian devil as part of their immune system. They increased in frequency due to natural selection. That is, the individuals with particular forms of these genes (alleles) survived and reproduced disproportionately to those that lacked the specific variants when disease was present.

In 2018, a devil population in the far southwest of Tasmania was reported to be free of DFTD.

== Society and culture ==
In 2008, a devil—given the name Cedric by those who treated and worked with him—was thought to have a natural immunity to the disease, but developed two facial tumours in late 2008. The tumours were removed, and officials thought Cedric was recovering well, but in September 2010, the cancer was discovered to have spread to the lungs, leading to his euthanasia.

== Research directions ==
Vaccination with irradiated cancer cells has not proven successful.

In 2013, a study using mice as a model for Tasmanian devils suggested that a DFTD vaccine could be beneficial. In 2015, a study which mixed dead DFTD cells with an inflammatory substance stimulated an immune response in five out of six devils injected with the mixture, engendering for a vaccine against DFTD. Field testing of the potential vaccines has been undertaken as a collaborative project between the Menzies Institute for Medical Research and the Save the Tasmanian Devil Program. Strong immune responses were induced by the vaccine, but the vaccine did not protect all devils from developing DFTD. An oral bait vaccine for DFTD is in the early stages of development as of 2020.

Research by Professor Greg Woods from the University of Tasmania's Menzies Institute for Medical Research has shown encouraging evidence for the potential development of a vaccine using dead devil facial tumour disease cells to trigger an immune response in healthy devils. Field testing of the vaccine is being undertaken as a collaborative project between the Menzies Institute for Medical Research and the Save the Tasmanian Devil Program under the Wild Devil Recovery program, and aims to test the immunisation protocol as a tool in ensuring the devil's long-term survival in the wild.

In March 2017, scientists at the University of Tasmania presented an apparent first report of having successfully treated Tasmanian devils with the disease. Live cancer cells that were treated with IFN-γ to restore MHC-I expression, were injected into the infected devils to stimulate their immune system to recognise and fight the disease. In 2019, researchers from University of Sydney reported constricted diversity of the T cell repertoire in devils with DFTD, suggesting that DFTD may impact the host immune system directly. Several studies of immune checkpoint molecules, such as PD-1 and PD-L1, have been undertaken in devils and suggest that potential immune evasion pathways used by human cancers could also be active in DFTD.

There is some evidence suggesting that the DFTD tumour is evolving to be less fatal to the Tasmanian devils.

2023 study investigated whether Tasmanian devil cathelicidins, a group of seven antimicrobial peptides, exhibit cytotoxic activity against Devil Facial Tumour Disease type 1 (DFTD1) cells. The researchers tested all seven peptides in vitro and evaluated changes in gene expression using RNA sequencing to identify potential mechanisms of action. Several cathelicidins showed significant anticancer effects on DFTD1 cells, including alterations in pathways related to cell cycle regulation and tumour survival. The findings suggest that some Tasmanian devil cathelicidins may serve as candidates for further research into the development of novel therapeutic approaches for DFTD.
