= Coolah (Tasmanian devil) =

- Species: Tasmanian devil
- Sex: Male
- Born: January, 1997; Cincinnati Zoo, U.S.
- Died: May, 2004; Fort Wayne Children's Zoo, U.S.
- Known for: Being the last captive Tasmanian devil living outside of Australia (prior to 2013)

Coolah was a male Tasmanian devil that lived between January 1997 and May 2004. Born at the Cincinnati Zoo, Coolah was later transferred to the Toronto Zoo and eventually to the Fort Wayne Children's Zoo.
