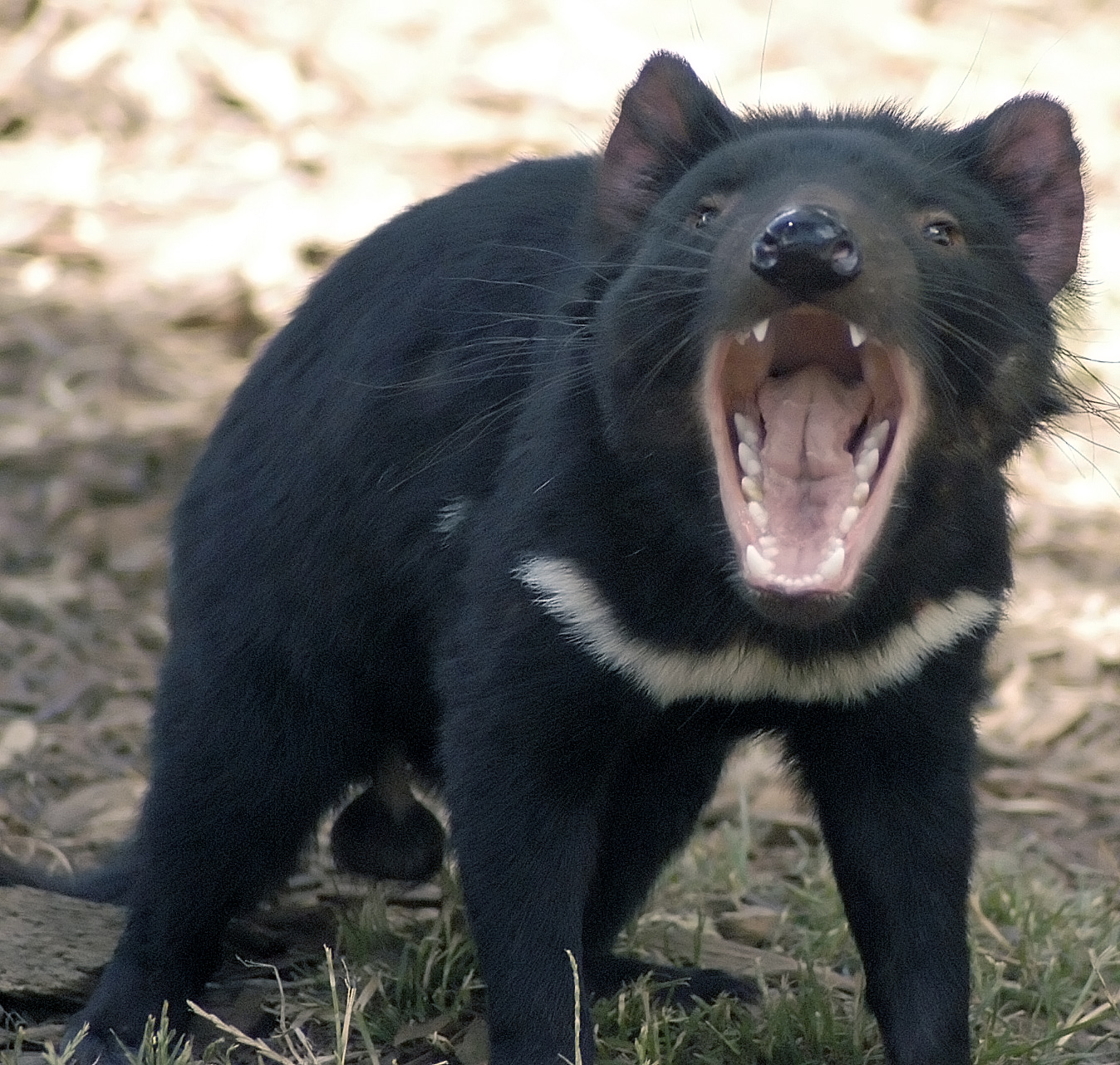
- The Tasmanian devil is the only living species from Sarcophilus.

Scientific classification
- Kingdom: Animalia
- Phylum: Chordata
- Class: Mammalia
- Infraclass: Marsupialia
- Order: Dasyuromorphia
- Family: Dasyuridae
- Subfamily: Dasyurinae
- Tribe: Dasyurini
- Genus: Sarcophilus; F. Cuvier, 1837

Type species
- Sarcophilus harrisii Boitard, 1841

Species
- S. harrisii; †S. laniarius; †S. moornaensis; †S. prior De Vis, 1883

= Sarcophilus =

Sarcophilus Temporal range: Pleistocene – recent

Genus of marsupials

Sarcophilus, from Ancient Greek σάρξ (sárx), meaning "flesh", and φίλος (phílos), meaning "loving", is a genus of carnivorous marsupial best known for its only living member, the Tasmanian devil.

There are four species of Sarcophilus. S. laniarius and S. moornaensis are only known from fossils from the Pleistocene. S. laniarius was larger than the contemporary, and only surviving, species S. harrisii, weighing up to 10 kilograms more. The relationship between the four species is unclear; while some have proposed that S. harrisii may be a dwarf version of S. laniarius, others argue that it is a completely different species and that the two may have coexisted during the Pleistocene.
