= Dasyurotaenia robusta =

Scientific classification
- Kingdom: Animalia
- Phylum: Platyhelminthes
- Class: Cestoda
- Order: Cyclophyllidea
- Family: Dilepididae
- Genus: Dasyurotaenia
- Species: D. robusta

Binomial name
- Dasyurotaenia robusta Beddard, 1912

Species of tapeworm

Dasyurotaenia robusta is a species of tapeworm that only lives on Tasmanian devils.
