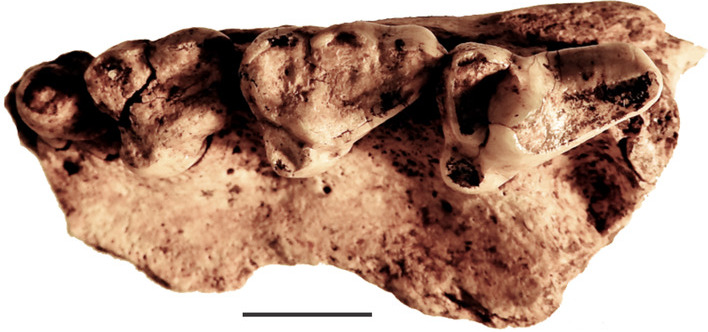

Scientific classification
- Domain: Eukaryota
- Kingdom: Animalia
- Phylum: Chordata
- Class: Mammalia
- Infraclass: Marsupialia
- Order: Dasyuromorphia
- Family: Dasyuridae
- Genus: Sarcophilus
- Species: †S. laniarius

Binomial name
- †Sarcophilus laniarius (Owen, 1838)

Synonyms
- Dasyurus laniarus

= Sarcophilus laniarius =

Sarcophilus laniarius Temporal range: Late Pleistocene

Extinct species of marsupial

Sarcophilus laniarius is an extinct species of marsupial in the genus Sarcophilus. It is therefore closely related to the Tasmanian devil (S. harrisii). Richard Owen originally named the species Dasyurus laniarus.

Pleistocene fossil deposits in limestone caves at Naracoorte, South Australia include specimens of S. laniarius, which were around 15% larger and 50% heavier than modern devils. Older specimens believed to be 50–70,000 years old were found in Darling Downs in Queensland and in Western Australia. It is not clear whether the modern devil evolved from S. laniarius, or whether they coexisted at the time. Richard Owen argued for the latter hypothesis in the 19th century based on fossils found in 1877 in New South Wales. It has been conjectured that S. laniarius and S. moornaensis, another now-extinct larger species, may have hunted and scavenged. It is known that there were several genera and species of thylacine millions of years ago, and that they ranged in size, the smaller being more reliant on foraging. As the devil and thylacine are similar, the extinction of the co-existing thylacine species has been cited as evidence for an analogous history for the devils. It has been speculated that the smaller size of S. laniarius and S. moornaensis allowed them to adapt to the changing conditions more effectively and survive longer than the corresponding thylacines.

As the extinction of these two species came at a similar time to human habitation of Australia, hunting by humans, as well as land clearing, have been mooted as possible causes. Critics of this theory point out that as indigenous Australians only developed boomerangs and spears for hunting around 10,000 years ago, a critical fall in numbers due to systemic hunting is unlikely. They also point out that caves inhabited by Aboriginal people have a low proportion of bones and rock paintings of devils, and that this is an indication that it was not a large part of indigenous lifestyle. A scientific report in 1910 claimed that Aboriginal people preferred the meat of herbivores rather than carnivores. The other main theory for the extinction was due to the climate change brought on by the most recent Ice Age.
