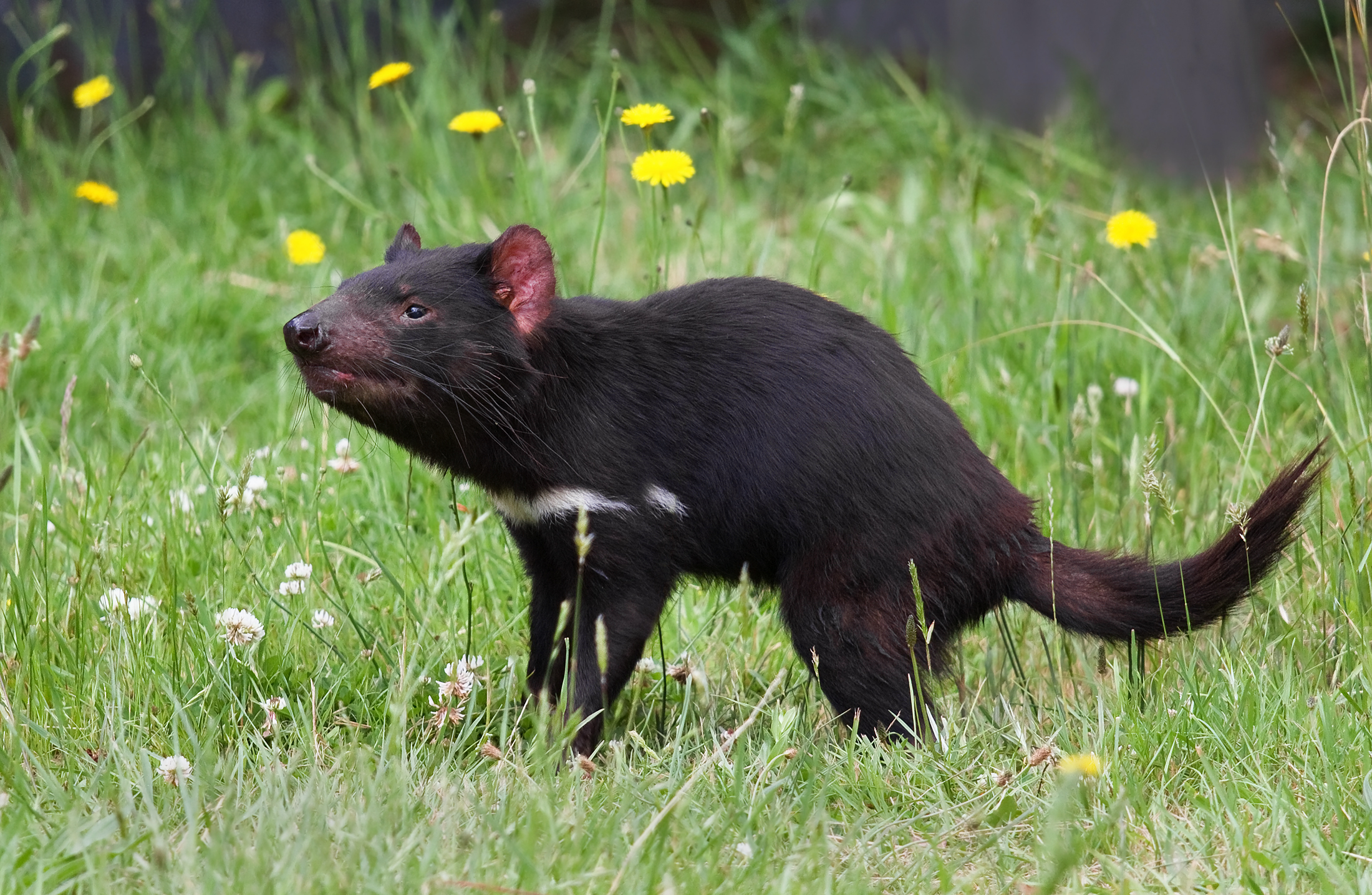

Conservation status
- Endangered (IUCN 3.1)

Scientific classification
- Kingdom: Animalia
- Phylum: Chordata
- Class: Mammalia
- Infraclass: Marsupialia
- Order: Dasyuromorphia
- Family: Dasyuridae
- Genus: Sarcophilus
- Species: S. harrisii

Binomial name
- Sarcophilus harrisii (Boitard, 1841)
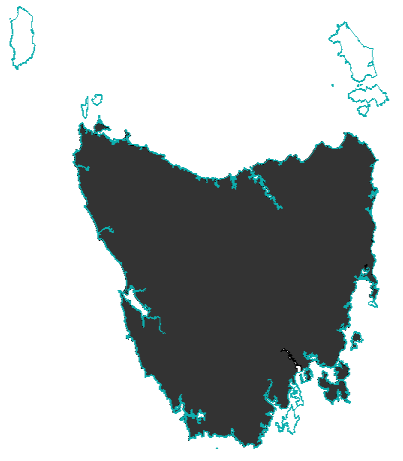
- Distribution of the Tasmanian devil on Tasmania in black (note: reintroduced New South Wales distribution not mapped)

= Tasmanian devil =

Tasmanian devil Temporal range: Holocene

Australian carnivorous marsupial

The Tasmanian devil (Sarcophilus harrisii; palawa kani: purinina) is a carnivorous marsupial of the family Dasyuridae. It was formerly present across mainland Australia, but became extinct there around 3,500 years ago; it is now confined to the island of Tasmania. The size of a small dog, the Tasmanian devil became the largest carnivorous marsupial in the world following the extinction of the thylacine in 1936. It is related to quolls, and distantly related to the thylacine. It is characterised by its stocky and muscular build, black fur, pungent odour, extremely loud screech, keen sense of smell, and ferocity when feeding. The Tasmanian devil's large head and neck allow it to generate among the strongest bites per unit body mass of any extant predatory land mammal. It hunts prey and scavenges on carrion.

Although devils are usually solitary, they sometimes eat and defecate together in a communal location. Unlike most other dasyurids, the devil thermoregulates effectively, and is active during the middle of the day without overheating. Despite its rotund appearance, it is capable of surprising speed and endurance, and can climb trees and swim across rivers. Devils are not monogamous. Males fight one another for females, and guard their partners to prevent female infidelity. Females can ovulate three times in as many weeks during the mating season, and 80% of two-year-old females are seen to be pregnant during the annual mating season.

Females average four breeding seasons in their life, and give birth to 20 to 30 live young after three weeks' gestation. The newborn are pink, lack fur, have indistinct facial features, and weigh around 0.20 g (0.0071 oz) at birth. As there are only four nipples in the pouch, competition is fierce, and few newborns survive. The young grow rapidly, and are ejected from the pouch after around 100 days, weighing roughly 200 g (7.1 oz). The young become independent after around nine months.

In 1941, devils became officially protected. Since the late 1990s, devil facial tumour disease (DFTD) has drastically reduced the population and now threatens the survival of the species, which in 2008 was declared to be endangered. Starting in 2013, Tasmanian devils are again being sent to zoos around the world as part of the Australian government's Save the Tasmanian Devil Program. The devil is an iconic symbol of Tasmania and many organisations, groups and products associated with the state use the animal in their logos. It is seen as an important attractor of tourists to Tasmania and has come to worldwide attention through the Looney Tunes character of the same name.

== Taxonomy ==
Believing it to be a type of opossum, naturalist George Harris wrote the first published description of the Tasmanian devil in 1807, naming it Didelphis ursina, due to its bearlike characteristics such as the round ear. He had earlier made a presentation on the topic at the Zoological Society of London. However, that particular binomial name had been given to the common wombat (later reclassified as Vombatus ursinus) by George Shaw in 1800, and was hence unavailable. In 1838, a specimen was named Dasyurus laniarius by Richard Owen, but by 1877 he had relegated it to Sarcophilus. The modern Tasmanian devil was named Sarcophilus harrisii ("Harris's flesh-lover") by French naturalist Pierre Boitard in 1841.

A later revision of the devil's taxonomy, published in 1987, attempted to change the species name to Sarcophilus laniarius based on mainland fossil records of only a few animals. However, this was not accepted by the taxonomic community at large; the name S. harrisii has been retained and S. laniarius relegated to a fossil species. "Beelzebub's pup" was an early vernacular name given to it by the explorers of Tasmania, in reference to a religious figure who is a prince of hell and an assistant of Satan; the explorers first encountered the animal by hearing its far-reaching vocalisations at night. Related names that were used in the 19th century were Sarcophilus satanicus ("Satanic flesh-lover") and Diabolus ursinus ("bear devil"), all due to early misconceptions of the species as implacably vicious. The Tasmanian devil (Sarcophilus harrisii) belongs to the family Dasyuridae. The genus Sarcophilus contains two other species, known only from Pleistocene fossils: S. laniarius and S. moomaensis. Phylogenetic analysis shows that the Tasmanian devil is most closely related to quolls.

According to Pemberton, the possible ancestors of the devil may have needed to climb trees to acquire food, leading to a growth in size and the hopping gait of many marsupials. He speculated that these adaptations may have caused the contemporary devil's peculiar gait. The specific lineage of the Tasmanian devil is theorised to have emerged during the Miocene, molecular evidence suggesting a split from the ancestors of quolls between 10 and 15 million years ago, when severe climate change came to bear in Australia, transforming the climate from warm and moist to an arid, dry ice age, resulting in mass extinctions. As most of their prey died of the cold, only a few carnivores survived, including the ancestors of the quoll and thylacine. It is speculated that the devil lineage may have arisen at this time to fill a niche in the ecosystem, as a scavenger that disposed of carrion left behind by the selective-eating thylacine. The extinct Glaucodon ballaratensis of the Pliocene age has been dubbed an intermediate species between the quoll and devil.

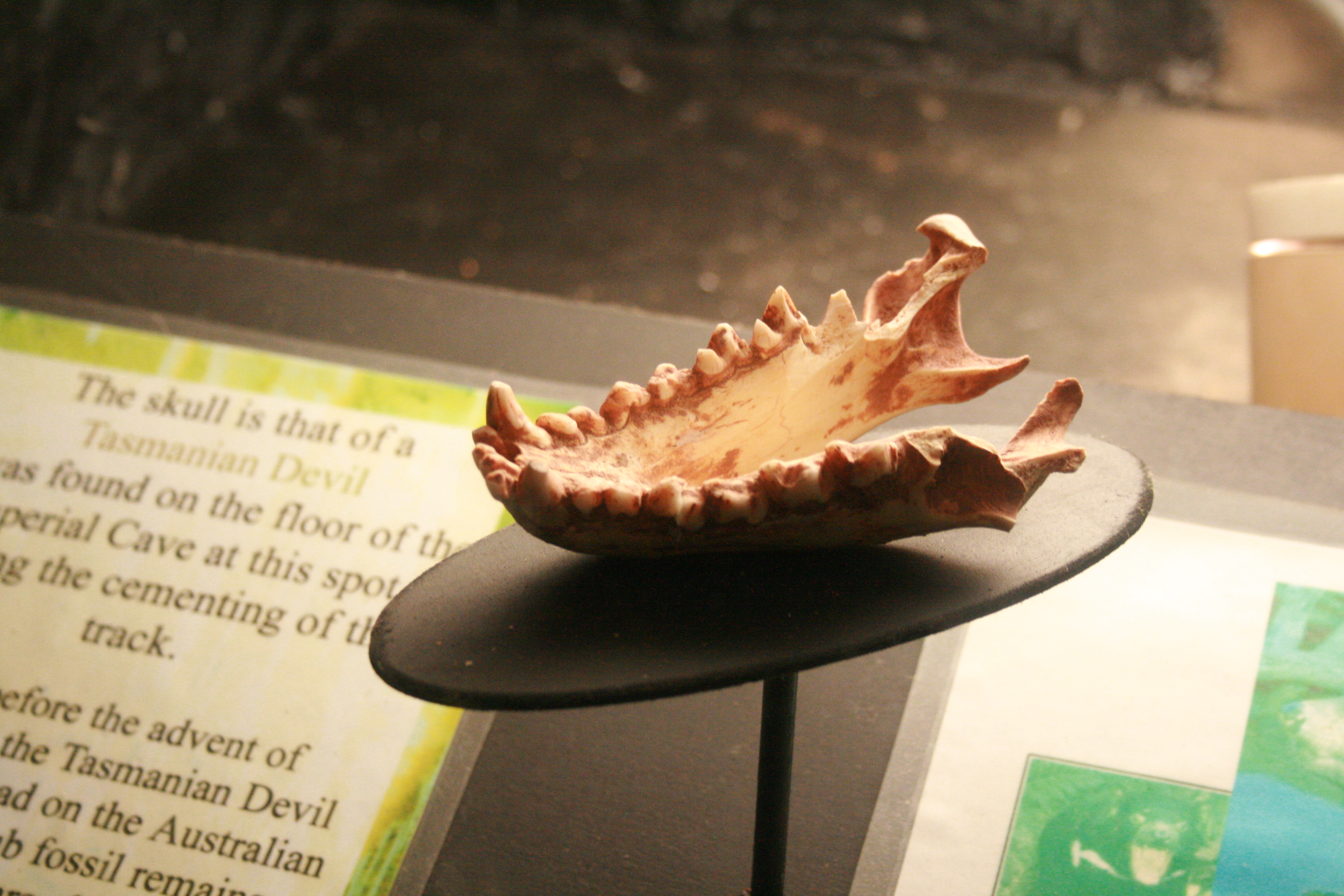
A jawbone found in the mainland Jenolan Caves

Fossil deposits in limestone caves at Naracoorte, South Australia, dating to the Miocene include specimens of S. laniarius, which were around 15% larger and 50% heavier than modern devils. Older specimens believed to be 50–70,000 years old were found in Darling Downs in Queensland and in Western Australia. It is not clear whether the modern devil evolved from S. laniarius, or whether they coexisted at the time. Richard Owen argued for the latter hypothesis in the 19th century, based on fossils found in 1877 in New South Wales. Large bones attributed to S. moornaensis have been found in New South Wales, and it has been conjectured that these two extinct larger species may have hunted and scavenged. It is known that there were several genera of thylacine millions of years ago, and that they ranged in size, the smaller being more reliant on foraging. As the devil and thylacine are similar, the extinction of the co-existing thylacine genera has been cited as evidence for an analogous history for the devils. It has been speculated that the smaller size of S. laniarius and S. moornaensis allowed them to adapt to the changing conditions more effectively and survive longer than the corresponding thylacines. As the extinction of these two species came at a similar time to human habitation of Australia, hunting by humans and land clearance have been mooted as possible causes. Critics of this theory point out that as indigenous Australians only developed boomerangs and spears for hunting around 10,000 years ago, a critical fall in numbers due to systematic hunting is unlikely. They also point out that caves inhabited by Aboriginal people have a low proportion of bones and rock paintings of devils, and suggest that this is an indication that it was not a large part of indigenous lifestyle. A scientific report in 1910 claimed that Aboriginal preferred the meat of herbivores rather than carnivores. The other main theory for the extinction was that it was due to the climate change brought on by the most recent ice age.

=== Genetics ===
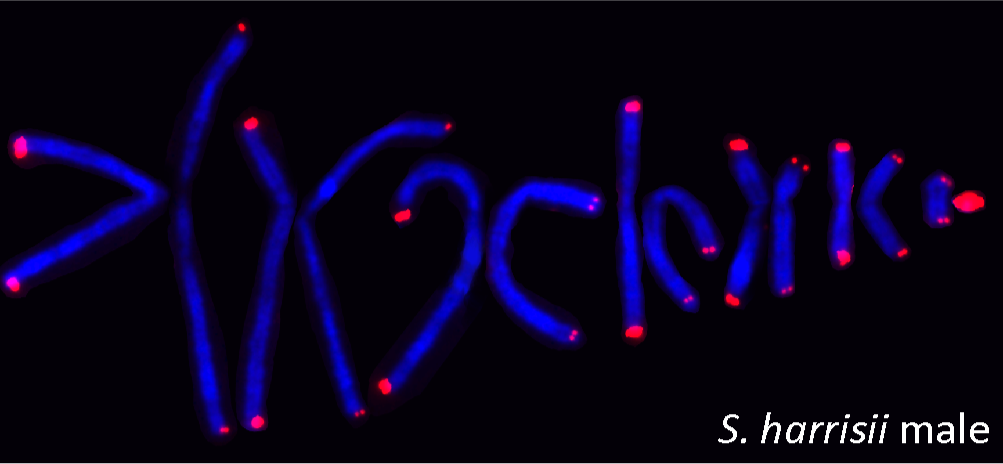
Karyotype of male Tasmanian devil

The Tasmanian devil's genome was sequenced in 2010 by the Wellcome Trust Sanger Institute. Like all dasyurids, the devil has 14 chromosomes. Devils have a low genetic diversity compared to other Australian marsupials and placental carnivores; this is consistent with a founder effect as allelic size ranges were low and nearly continuous throughout all subpopulations measured. Allelic diversity was measured at 2.7–3.3 in the subpopulations sampled, and heterozygosity was in the range 0.386–0.467. According to a study by Menna Jones, "gene flow appears extensive up to 50 km (31 mi)", meaning a high assignment rate to source or close neighbour populations "in agreement with movement data. At larger scales (150–250 km or 93–155 mi), gene flow is reduced but there is no evidence for isolation by distance". Island effects may also have contributed to their low genetic diversity. Periods of low population density may also have created moderate population bottlenecks, reducing genetic diversity. Low genetic diversity is thought to have been a feature in the Tasmanian devil population since the mid-Holocene. Outbreaks of devil facial tumour disease (DFTD) cause an increase in inbreeding. A sub-population of devils in the north-west of the state is genetically distinct from other devils, but there is some exchange between the two groups.

One strand conformation polymorphism analysis (OSCP) on the major histocompatibility complex (MHC) class I domain taken from various locations across Tasmania showed 25 different types, and showed a different pattern of MHC types in north-western Tasmania to eastern Tasmania. Those devils in the east of the state have less MHC diversity; 30% are of the same type as the tumour (type 1), and 24% are of type A. Seven of every ten devils in the east are of type A, D, G or 1, which are linked to DFTD; whereas only 55% of the western devils fall into these MHC categories. Of the 25 MHC types, 40% are exclusive to the western devils. Although the north-west population is less genetically diverse overall, it has higher MHC gene diversity, which allows them to mount an immune response to DFTD. According to this research, mixing the devils may increase the chance of disease. Of the fifteen different regions in Tasmania surveyed in this research, six were in the eastern half of the island. In the eastern half, Epping Forest had only two different types, 75% being type O. In the Buckland-Nugent area, only three types were present, and there were an average of 5.33 different types per location. In contrast, in the west, Cape Sorell yielded three types, and Togari North-Christmas Hills yielded six, but the other seven sites all had at least eight MHC types, and West Pencil Pine had 15 types. There was an average of 10.11 MHC types per site in the west. Recent research has suggested that the wild population of devils are rapidly evolving a resistance to DFTD.

== Description ==
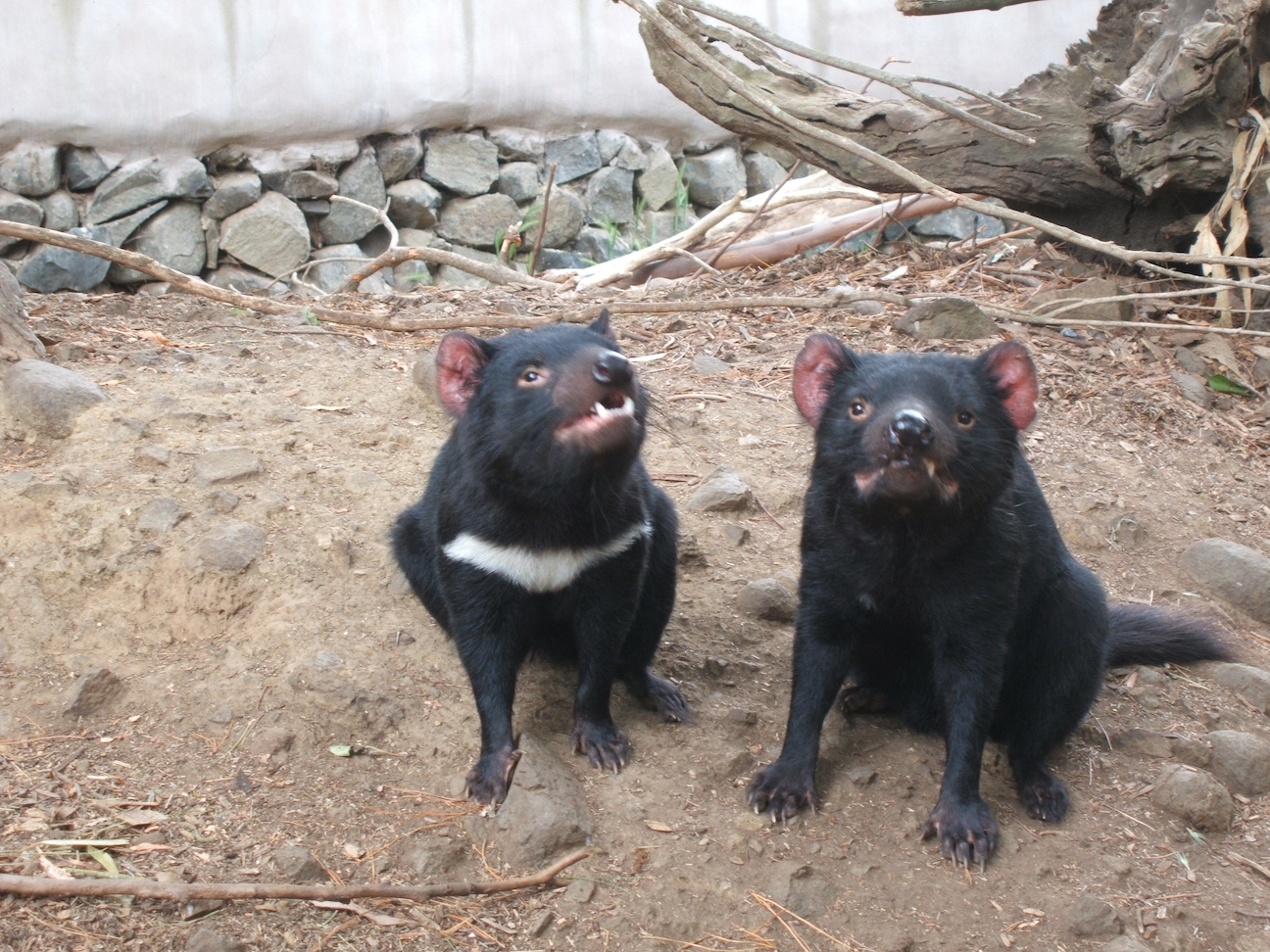
Two devils, one without any white markings. Around 16% of wild devils have no markings.

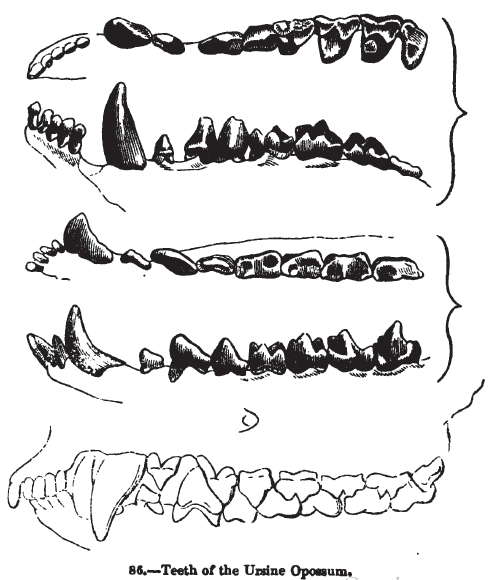
Dentition, as illustrated in Knight's Sketches in Natural History

The Tasmanian devil is the largest surviving carnivorous marsupial. It has a squat, thick build, with a large head and a tail which is about half its body length. Unusually for a marsupial, its forelegs are slightly longer than its hind legs, and devils can run up to 13 km/h (8.1 mph) for short distances, on typical terrain, though on flat roads they have been recorded reaching speeds of up to 25 km/h (16 mph) for distances up to 1.5 km (0.93 mi).. The fur is usually black, often with irregular white patches on the chest and rump (although approximately 16% of wild devils do not have white patches). These markings suggest that the devil is most active at dawn and dusk, and they are thought to draw biting attacks toward less important areas of the body, as fighting between devils often leads to a concentration of scars in that region. Males are usually larger than females, having an average head and body length of 652 mm (25.7 in), a 258 mm (10.2 in) tail and an average weight of 8 kg (18 lb). Females have an average head and body length of 570 mm (22 in), a 244 mm (9.6 in) tail and an average weight of 6 kg (13 lb), although devils in western Tasmania tend to be smaller. Devils have five long toes on their forefeet, four pointing to the front and one coming out from the side, which gives the devil the ability to hold food. The hind feet have four toes, and the devils have non-retractable claws. The stocky devils have a relatively low centre of mass.

Devils are fully grown at two years of age, and few devils live longer than five years in the wild. Possibly the longest-lived Tasmanian devil recorded was Coolah, a male devil which lived in captivity for more than seven years. Born in January 1997 at the Cincinnati Zoo, Coolah died in May 2004 at the Fort Wayne Children's Zoo. The devil stores body fat in its tail, and healthy devils have fat tails. The tail is largely non-prehensile and is important to its physiology, social behaviour and locomotion. It acts as a counterbalance to aid stability when the devil is moving quickly. An ano-genital scent gland at the base of its tail is used to mark the ground behind the animal with its strong, pungent scent. The male has external testes in a pouch-like structure formed by lateral ventrocrural folds of the abdomen, which partially hides and protects them. The testes are subovoid in shape and the mean dimensions of 30 testes of adult males was 3.17 cm × 2.57 cm (1.25 in × 1.01 in). The female's pouch opens backwards, and is present throughout its life, unlike some other dasyurids.

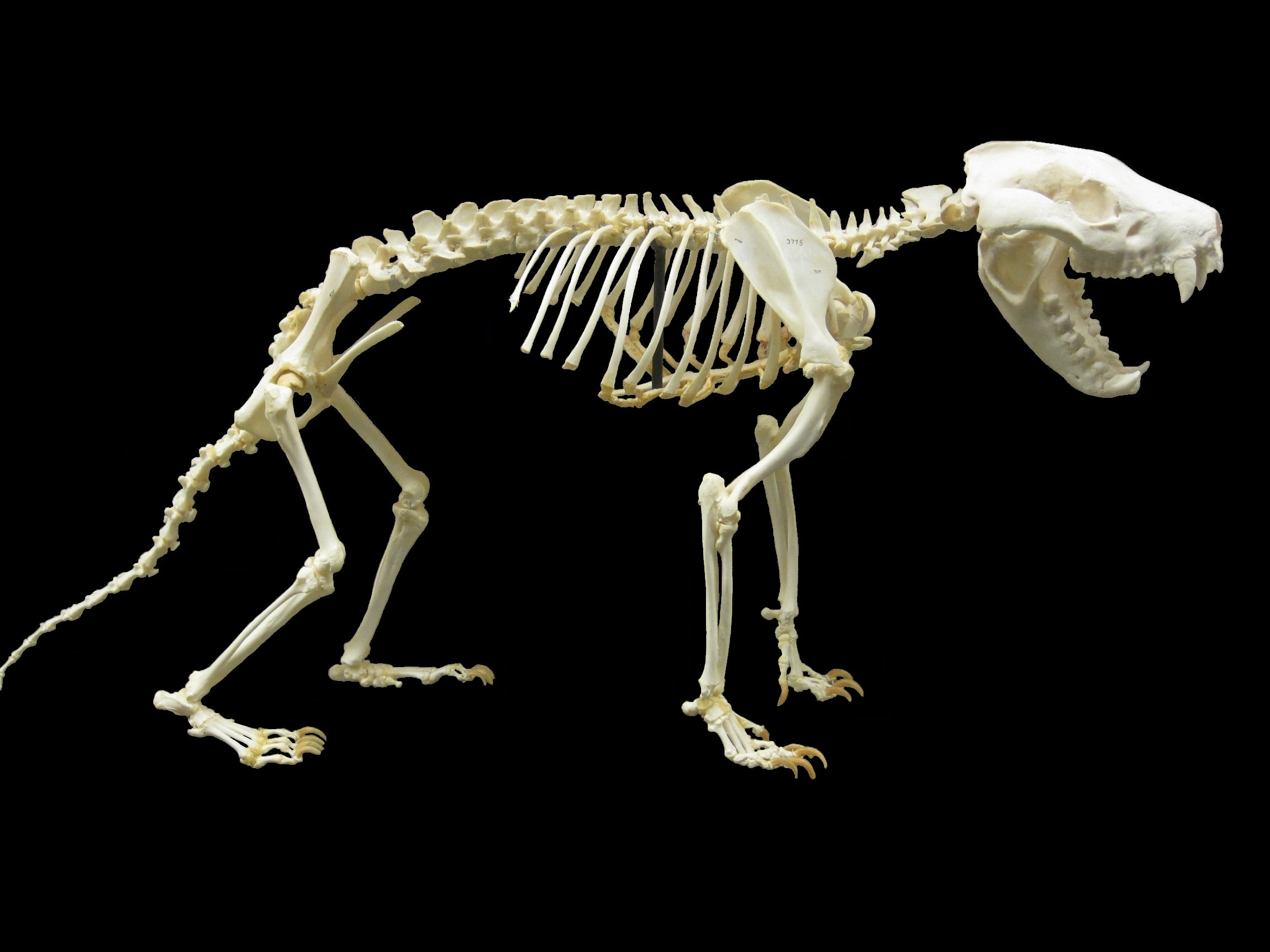
Tasmanian devil skeleton on display at the Museum of Osteology, Oklahoma City, Oklahoma

The Tasmanian devil has the most powerful bite relative to body size of any living mammalian carnivore, with a Bite Force Quotient of 181 and exerting a canine bite force of 553 N (124 lb_{f}). The jaw can open to 75–80 degrees, allowing the devil to generate the large amount of power to tear meat and crush bones—sufficient force to allow it to bite through thick metal wire. The power of the jaws is in part due to its comparatively large head. The teeth and jaws of Tasmanian devils resemble those of hyenas, an example of convergent evolution. Dasyurid teeth resemble those of primitive marsupials. Like all dasyurids, the devil has prominent canines and cheek teeth. It has three pairs of lower incisors and four pairs of upper incisors. These are located at the top of the front of the devil's mouth. Like dogs, it has 42 teeth, however, unlike dogs, its teeth are not replaced after birth but grow continuously throughout life at a slow rate. It has a "highly carnivorous dentition and trophic adaptations for bone consumption". The devil has long claws that allow it to dig burrows and seek subterranean food easily and grip prey or mates strongly. The teeth and claw strength allow the devil to attack wombats up to 30 kg (66 lb) in weight. The large neck and forebody that give the devil its strength also cause this strength to be biased towards the front half of the body; the lopsided, awkward, shuffling gait of the devil is attributed to this.

The devil has long whiskers on its face and in clumps on the top of the head. These help the devil locate prey when foraging in the dark, and aid in detecting when other devils are close during feeding. The whiskers can extend from the tip of the chin to the rear of the jaw and can cover the span of its shoulder. Hearing is its dominant sense, and it also has an excellent sense of smell, which has a range of 1 km (0.62 mi). The devil, unlike other marsupials, has a "well-defined, saddle-shaped ectotympanic". Since devils hunt at night, their vision seems to be strongest in black and white. In these conditions they can detect moving objects readily, but have difficulty seeing stationary objects.

== Distribution and habitat ==
The Tasmanian devil was formerly present across mainland Australia, but became extinct there 3,500 years ago, co-incident with the extinction of the thylacine from the region. A number of causal factors for the extinction have been proposed, including the introduction of the dingo, intensification of human activity, as well as climatic change.

Devils are found in all habitats on the island of Tasmania, including the outskirts of urban areas, and are distributed throughout the Tasmanian mainland and on Robbins Island (which is connected to mainland Tasmania at low tide). The north-western population is located west of the Forth River and as far south as Macquarie Heads. Previously, they were present on Bruny Island from the 19th century, but there have been no records of them after 1900. They were illegally introduced to Badger Island in the mid-1990s but were removed by the Tasmanian government by 2007. Although the Badger Island population was free from DFTD, the removed individuals were returned to the Tasmanian mainland, some to infected areas. A study has modelled the reintroduction of DFTD-free Tasmanian devils to the Australian mainland in areas where dingoes are sparse. It is proposed that devils would have fewer impacts on both livestock and native fauna than dingoes, and that the mainland population could act as an additional insurance population. In September 2015, 20 immunised captive-bred devils were released into Narawntapu National Park, Tasmania. Two later died from being hit by cars.

The "core habitat" of the devils is considered to be within the "low to moderate annual rainfall zone of eastern and north-western Tasmania". Tasmanian devils particularly like dry sclerophyll forests and coastal woodlands. Although they are not found at the highest altitudes of Tasmania, and their population density is low in the button grass plains in the south-west of the state, their population is high in dry or mixed sclerophyll forests and coastal heaths. Devils prefer open forest to tall forest, and dry rather than wet forests. They are also found near roads where roadkill is prevalent, although the devils themselves are often killed by vehicles while retrieving the carrion. According to the Threatened Species Scientific Committee, their versatility means that habitat modification from destruction is not seen as a major threat to the species.

The devil is directly linked to the Dasyurotaenia robusta, a tapeworm which is classified as Rare under the Tasmanian Threatened Species Protection Act 1995. This tapeworm is found only in devils.

In late 2020, Tasmanian devils were reintroduced to mainland Australia in a sanctuary run by Aussie Ark in the Barrington Tops area of New South Wales. This was the first time devils had lived on the Australian mainland in over 3,000 years. 26 adult devils were released into the 400 ha (990 acres) protected area, and by late April 2021, seven joeys had been born, with up to 20 expected by the end of the year.

== Ecology and behaviour ==
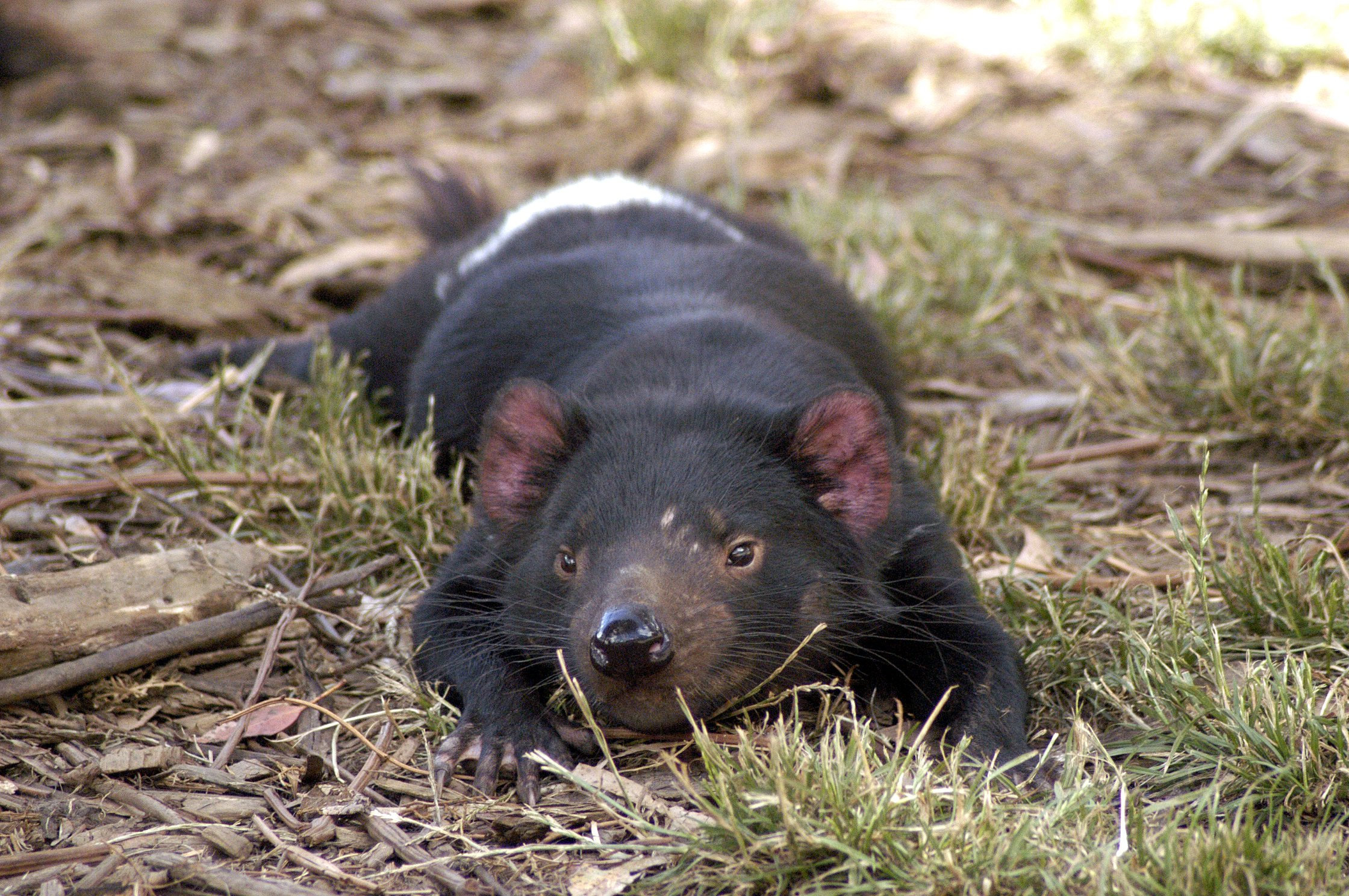
Although Tasmanian devils are nocturnal, they like to rest in the sun. Scarring from fighting is visible next to this devil's left eye.

The Tasmanian devil is a keystone species in the ecosystem of Tasmania. It is a nocturnal and crepuscular hunter, spending the days in dense bush or in a hole. It has been speculated that nocturnalism may have been adopted to avoid predation by eagles and humans. Young devils are predominantly crepuscular. There is no evidence of torpor.

Young devils can climb trees, but this becomes more difficult as they grow larger. Devils can scale trees of trunk diameter larger than 40 cm (16 in), which tend to have no small side branches to hang onto, up to a height of around 2.5–3 m (8 ft 2 in – 9 ft 10 in). Devils that are yet to reach maturity can climb shrubs to a height of 4 m (13 ft), and can climb a tree to 7 m (23 ft) if it is not vertical. Adult devils may eat young devils if they are very hungry, so this climbing behaviour may be an adaptation to allow young devils to escape. Devils can also swim and have been observed crossing rivers that are 50 m (160 ft) in width, including icy cold waterways, apparently enthusiastically.

Tasmanian devils do not form packs, but rather spend most of their time alone once weaned. Classically considered as solitary animals, their social interactions were poorly understood. However, a field study published in 2009 shed some light on this. Tasmanian devils in Narawntapu National Park were fitted with proximity sensing radio collars which recorded their interactions with other devils over several months from February to June 2006. This revealed that all devils were part of a single huge contact network, characterised by male–female interactions during mating season, while female–female interactions were the most common at other times, although frequency and patterns of contact did not vary markedly between seasons. Previously thought to fight over food, males only rarely interacted with other males. Hence, all devils in a region are part of a single social network. They are considered to be non-territorial in general, but females are territorial around their dens. This allows a higher total mass of devils to occupy a given area than territorial animals, without conflict. Tasmanian devils instead occupy a home range. In a period of between two and four weeks, devils' home ranges are estimated to vary between 4 and 27 km^{2} (1.5 and 10.4 sq mi), with an average of 13 km^{2} (5.0 sq mi). The location and geometry of these areas depend on the distribution of food, particularly wallabies and pademelons nearby.

Devils use three or four dens regularly. Dens formerly owned by wombats are especially prized as maternity dens because of their security. Dense vegetation near creeks, thick grass tussocks, and caves are also used as dens. Adult devils use the same dens for life. It is believed that, as a secure den is highly prized, some may have been used for several centuries by generations of animals. Studies have suggested that food security is less important than den security, as habitat destruction that affects the latter has had more effect on mortality rates. Young pups remain in one den with their mother, and other devils are mobile, changing dens every 1–3 days and travelling a mean distance of 8.6 km (5.3 mi) every night. However, there are also reports that an upper bound can be 50 km (31 mi) per night. They choose to travel through lowlands, saddles and along the banks of creeks, particularly preferring carved-out tracks and livestock paths and eschewing steep slopes and rocky terrain. The amount of movement is believed to be similar throughout the year, except for mothers who have given birth recently. The similarity in travel distances for males and females is unusual for sexually dimorphic, solitary carnivores. As a male needs more food, he will spend more time eating than travelling. Devils typically make circuits of their home range during their hunts. In areas near human habitation, they are known to steal clothes, blankets and pillows and take them for use in dens in wooden buildings.

While the dasyurids have similar diet and anatomy, differing body sizes affect thermoregulation and thus behaviour. In ambient temperatures between 5 and 30 °C (41 and 86 °F), the devil was able to maintain a body temperature between 37.4 and 38 °C (99.3 and 100.4 °F). When the temperature was raised to 40 °C (104 °F), and the humidity to 50%, the devil's body temperature spiked upwards by 2 °C (3.6 °F) within 60 minutes, but then steadily decreased back to the starting temperature after a further two hours, and remained there for two more hours. During this time, the devil drank water and showed no visible signs of discomfort, leading scientists to believe that sweating and evaporative cooling is its primary means of heat dissipation. A later study found that devils pant but do not sweat to release heat. In contrast, many other marsupials were unable to keep their body temperatures down. As the smaller animals have to live in hotter and more arid conditions to which they are less well-adapted, they take up a nocturnal lifestyle and drop their body temperatures during the day, whereas the devil is active in the day and its body temperature varies by 1.8 °C (3.2 °F) from its minimum at night to the maximum in the middle of the day.

The standard metabolic rate of a Tasmanian devil is 141 kJ/kg (15.3 kcal/lb) per day, many times lower than smaller marsupials. A 5 kg (11 lb) devil uses 712 kJ (170,000 cal) per day. The field metabolic rate is 407 kJ/kg (44.1 kcal/lb). Along with quolls, Tasmanian devils have a metabolic rate comparable to non-carnivorous marsupials of a similar size. This differs from placental carnivores, which have comparatively high basal metabolic rates. A study of devils showed a loss of weight from 7.9 to 7.1 kg (17 to 16 lb) from summer to winter, but in the same time, daily energy consumption increased from 2,591 to 2,890 kJ (619,000 to 691,000 cal). This is equivalent to an increase in food consumption from 518 to 578 g (18.3 to 20.4 oz). The diet is protein-based with 70% water content. For every 1 g (0.035 oz) of insects consumed, 3.5 kJ (840 cal) of energy are produced, while a corresponding amount of wallaby meat generated 5.0 kJ (1,200 cal). In terms of its body mass, the devil eats only a quarter of the eastern quoll's intake, allowing it to survive longer during food shortages.

=== Feeding ===
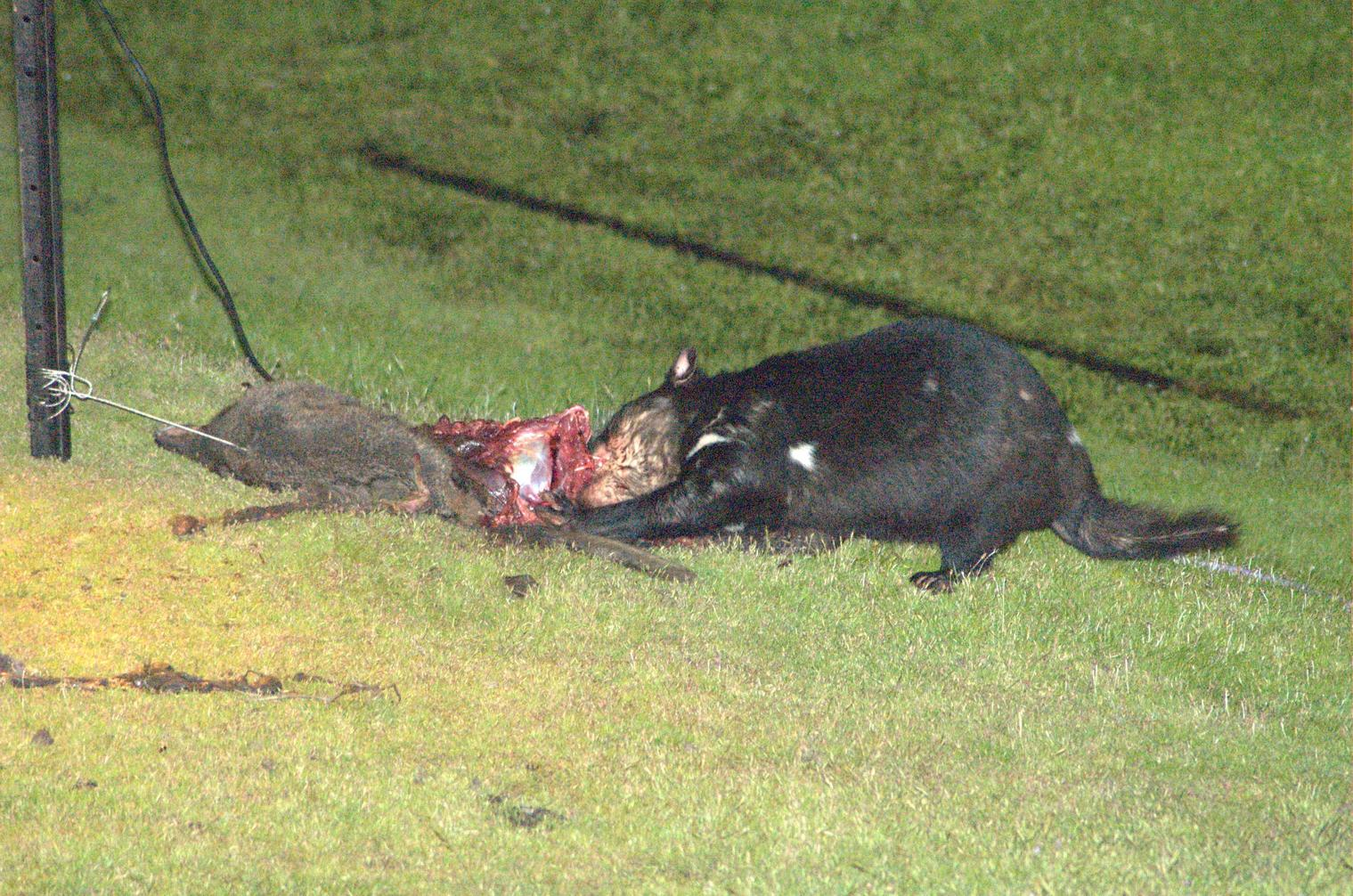
A devil eating roadkill

Tasmanian devils can take prey up to the size of a small kangaroo, but in practice they are opportunistic and eat carrion more often than they hunt live prey. Although the devil favours wombats because of the ease of predation and high fat content, it will eat all small native mammals such as wallabies, bettong and potoroos, domestic mammals (including sheep and rabbits), birds (including penguins), fish, fruit, vegetable matter, insects, tadpoles, frogs and reptiles. Their diet is widely varied and depends on the food available. Before the extinction of the thylacine, the Tasmanian devil ate thylacine joeys left alone in dens when their parents were away. This may have helped to hasten the extinction of the thylacine, which also ate devils. They are known to hunt water rats by the sea and forage on dead fish that have been washed ashore. Near human habitation, they can also steal shoes and chew on them, and eat the legs of otherwise robust sheep that have slipped in wooden shearing sheds, leaving their legs dangling below. Other unusual matter observed in devil scats includes collars and tags of devoured animals, intact echidna spines, pencil, plastic and jeans. Devils can bite through metal traps, and tend to reserve their strong jaws for escaping captivity rather than breaking into food storage. Due to their relative lack of speed, they cannot run down a wallaby or a rabbit, but they can attack animals that have become slow due to illness. They survey flocks of sheep by sniffing them from 10–15 m (33–49 ft) away and attack if the prey is ill. The sheep stamp their feet in a show of strength.

Despite their lack of extreme speed, there have been reports that devils can run at 25 km/h (16 mph) for 1.5 km (0.93 mi) on flat ground, and it has been conjectured that, before European immigration and the introduction of livestock, vehicles and roadkill, they would have had to chase other native animals at a reasonable pace to find food. Pemberton has reported that they can average 10 km/h (6.2 mph) for "extended periods" on several nights per week, and that they run for long distances before sitting still for up to half an hour, something that has been interpreted as evidence of ambush predation.

Devils can dig to forage corpses, in one case digging down to eat the corpse of a buried horse that had died due to illness. They are known to eat animal cadavers by first ripping out the digestive system, which is the softest part of the anatomy, and they often reside in the resulting cavity while they are eating.

On average, devils eat about 15% of their body weight each day, although they can eat up to 40% of their body weight in 30 minutes if the opportunity arises. This means they can become very heavy and lethargic after a large meal; in this state they tend to waddle away slowly and lie down, becoming easy to approach. This has led to a belief that such eating habits became possible due to the lack of a predator to attack such bloated individuals.

Tasmanian devils can eliminate all traces of a carcass of a smaller animal, devouring the bones and fur if desired. In this respect, devils have earned the gratitude of Tasmanian farmers, as the speed at which they clean a carcass helps prevent the spread of insects that might otherwise harm livestock. Some of these dead animals are disposed of when the devils haul off the excess feed back to their residence to continue eating at a later time.

The diet of a devil can vary substantially for males and females, and seasonally, according to studies at Cradle Mountain. In winter, males prefer medium mammals over larger ones, with a ratio of 4:5, but in summer, they prefer larger prey in a 7:2 ratio. These two categories accounted for more than 95% of the diet. Females are less inclined to target large prey, but have the same seasonal bias. In winter, large and medium mammals account for 25% and 58% each, with 7% small mammals and 10% birds. In summer, the first two categories account for 61% and 37% respectively.

Juvenile devils are sometimes known to climb trees; in addition to small vertebrates and invertebrates, juveniles climb trees to eat grubs and birds' eggs. Juveniles have also been observed climbing into nests and capturing birds. Throughout the year, adult devils derive 16.2% of their biomass intake from arboreal species, almost all of which is possum meat, just 1.0% being large birds. From February to July, subadult devils derive 35.8% of their biomass intake from arboreal life, 12.2% being small birds and 23.2% being possums. Female devils in winter source 40.0% of their intake from arboreal species, including 26.7% from possums and 8.9% from various birds. Not all of these animals were caught while they were in trees, but this high figure for females, which is higher than for male spotted-tailed quolls during the same season, is unusual, as the devil has inferior tree climbing skills.

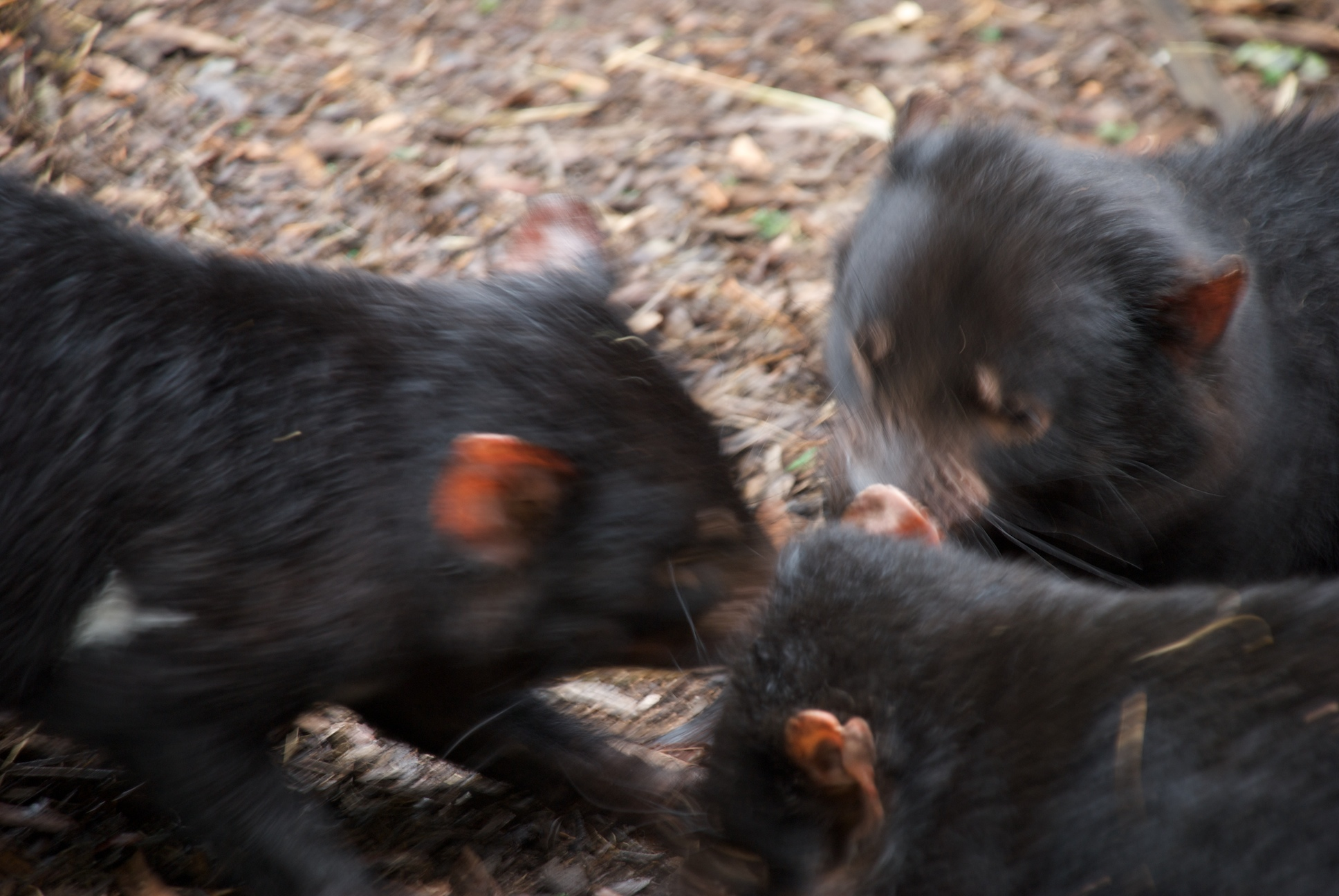
Three Tasmanian devils feeding. Eating is a social event for the Tasmanian devil, and groups of 2 to 5 are common.

Although they hunt alone, there have been unsubstantiated claims of communal hunting, where one devil drives prey out of its habitat and an accomplice attacks. Eating is a social event for the Tasmanian devil. This combination of a solitary animal that eats communally makes the devil unique among carnivores. Much of the noise attributed to the animal is a result of raucous communal eating, at which up to 12 individuals can gather, although groups of two to five are common; it can often be heard several kilometres away. This has been interpreted as notifications to colleagues to share in the meal, so that food is not wasted by rot and energy is saved. The amount of noise is correlated to the size of the carcass. The devils eat in accordance with a system. Juveniles are active at dusk, so they tend to reach the source before the adults. Typically, the dominant animal eats until it is satiated and leaves, fighting off any challengers in the meantime. Defeated animals run into the bush with their hair and tail erect, their conqueror in pursuit and biting their victim's rear where possible. Disputes are less common as the food source increases as the motive appears to be getting sufficient food rather than oppressing other devils. When quolls are eating a carcass, devils will tend to chase them away. This is a substantial problem for spotted-tailed quolls, as they kill relatively large possums and cannot finish their meal before devils arrive. In contrast, the smaller eastern quolls prey on much smaller victims, and can complete feeding before devils turn up. This is seen as a possible reason for the relatively small population of spotted-tailed quolls.

A study of feeding devils identified twenty physical postures, including their characteristic vicious yawn, and eleven different vocal sounds, including clicks, shrieks and various types of growls, that devils use to communicate as they feed. They usually establish dominance by sound and physical posturing, although fighting does occur. The white patches on the devil are visible to the night-vision of its colleagues. Chemical gestures are also used. Adult males are the most aggressive, and scarring is common. They can also stand on their hind legs and push each other's shoulders with their front legs and heads, similar to sumo wrestling. Torn flesh around the mouth and teeth, as well as punctures in the rump, can sometimes be observed, although these can also be inflicted during breeding fights.

Digestion is very fast in dasyurids and, for the Tasmanian devil, the few hours taken for food to pass through the small gut is a long period in comparison to some other dasyuridae. Devils are known to return to the same places to defecate, and to do so at a communal location, called a devil latrine. It is believed that the communal defecation may be a means of communication that is not well understood. Devil scats are very large compared to body size; they are on average 15 cm (5.9 in) long, but there have been samples that are 25 cm (9.8 in) in length. They are characteristically grey in colour due to digested bones, or have bone fragments included.

Owen and Pemberton believe that the relationship between Tasmanian devils and thylacines was "close and complex", as they competed directly for prey and probably also for shelter. The thylacines preyed on the devils, the devils scavenged from the thylacine's kills, and the devils ate thylacine young. Menna Jones hypothesises that the two species shared the role of apex predator in Tasmania. Wedge-tailed eagles have a similar carrion-based diet to the devils and are regarded as competitors. Quolls and devils are also seen as being in direct competition in Tasmania. Jones believed that the quoll has evolved into its current state in just 100–200 generations of around two years as determined by the equal spacing effect on the devil, the largest species, the spotted-tail quoll, and the smallest species, the eastern quoll. Both the Tasmanian devil and the quolls appears to have evolved up to 50 times faster than the average evolutionary rate amongst mammals.

=== Reproduction ===
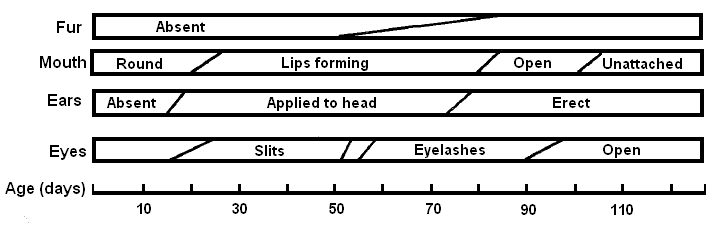
Developmental steps in the maturation of Tasmanian devil young. The diagonal lines indicate the amount of time the changes take; for example, it takes about 90 days for a devil to develop fur over all its body.

Females start to breed when they reach sexual maturity, typically in their second year. At this point, they become fertile once a year, producing multiple ova while in heat. As prey is most abundant in spring and early summer, the devil's reproductive cycle starts in March or April so that the end of the weaning period coincides with the maximisation of food supplies in the wild for the newly roaming young devils.

Occurring in March, mating takes places in sheltered locations during both day and night. Males fight over females in the breeding season, and female devils will mate with the dominant male. Females can ovulate up to three times in a 21-day period, and copulation can take five days; one instance of a couple being in the mating den for eight days has been recorded. Devils are not monogamous, and females will mate with several males if not guarded after mating; males also reproduce with several females during a season. Females have been shown to be selective in an attempt to ensure the best genetic offspring, for example, fighting off the advances of smaller males. Males often keep their mates in custody in the den, or take them along if they need to drink, lest they engage in infidelity.

Males can produce up to 16 offspring over their lifetime, while females average four mating seasons and 12 offspring. Theoretically this means that a devil population can double on an annual basis and make the species insulated against high mortality. The pregnancy rate is high; 80% of two-year-old females were observed with newborns in their pouches during the mating season. More recent studies of breeding place the mating season between February and June, as opposed to between February and March.

Gestation lasts 21 days, and devils give birth to 20–30 young standing up, each weighing approximately 0.18–0.24 g (0.0063–0.0085 oz). Embryonic diapause does not occur. At birth, the front limb has well-developed digits with claws; unlike many marsupials, the claws of baby devils are not deciduous. As with most other marsupials, the forelimb is longer (0.26–0.43 cm or 0.10–0.17 in) than the rear limb (0.20–0.28 cm or 0.079–0.110 in), the eyes are spots, and the body is pink. There are no external ears or openings. Unusually, the sex can be determined at birth, with an external scrotum present.

Tasmanian devil young are variously called "pups", "joeys", or "imps". When the young are born, competition is fierce as they move from the vagina in a sticky flow of mucus to the pouch. Once inside the pouch, they each remain attached to a nipple for the next 100 days. The female Tasmanian devil's pouch, like that of the wombat, opens to the rear, so it is physically difficult for the female to interact with young inside the pouch. Despite the large litter at birth, the female has only four nipples, so there are never more than four babies nursing in the pouch, and the older a female devil gets, the smaller her litters will become. Once the young have made contact with the nipple, it expands, resulting in the oversized nipple being firmly clamped inside the newborn and ensuring that the newborn does not fall out of the pouch. On average, more females survive than males, and up to 60% of young do not survive to maturity. Milk replacements are often used for devils that have been bred in captivity, for orphaned devils or young who are born to diseased mothers. Little is known about the composition of the devil's milk compared to other marsupials.

Inside the pouch, the nourished young develop quickly. In the second week, the rhinarium becomes distinctive and heavily pigmented. At 15 days, the external parts of the ear are visible, although these are attached to the head and do not open out until the devil is around 10 weeks old. The ear begins blackening after around 40 days, when it is less than 1 cm (0.39 in) long, and by the time the ear becomes erect, it is between 1.2 and 1.6 cm (0.47 and 0.63 in). Eyelids are apparent at 16 days, whiskers at 17 days, and the lips at 20 days. The devils can make squeaking noises after eight weeks, and after around 10–11 weeks, the lips can open. Despite the formation of eyelids, they do not open for three months, although eyelashes form at around 50 days. The young—up to this point they are pink—start to grow fur at 49 days and have a full coat by 90 days. The fur growing process starts at the snout and proceeds back through the body, although the tail attains fur before the rump, which is the last part of the body to become covered. Just before the start of the furring process, the colour of the bare devil's skin will darken and become black or dark grey in the tail.

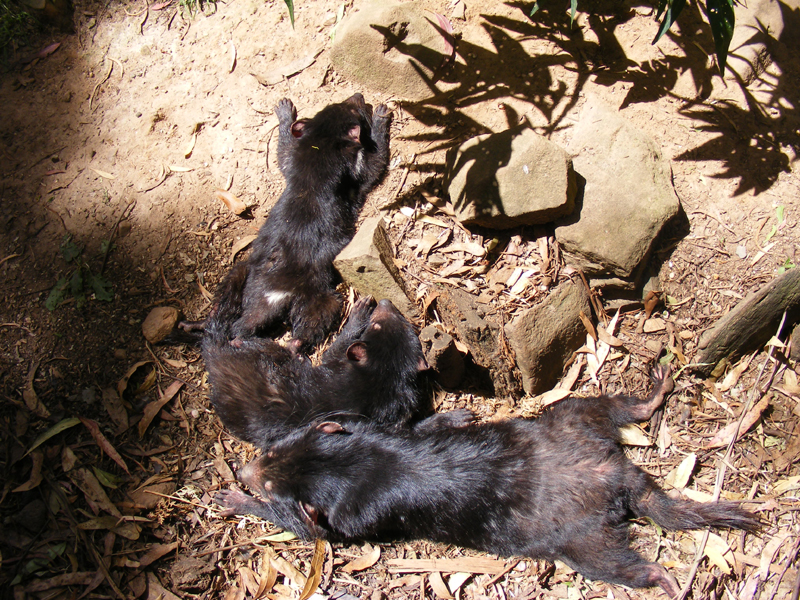
Three young devils sunbathing

The devils have a complete set of facial vibrissae and ulnar carpels, although it is devoid of anconeal vibrissae. During the third week, the mystacials and ulnarcarpals are the first to form. Subsequently, the infraorbital, interramal, supraorbital and submental vibrissae form. The last four typically occur between the 26th and 39th day. Their eyes open shortly after their fur coat develops—between 87 and 93 days—and their mouths can relax their hold of the nipple at 100 days. They leave the pouch 105 days after birth, appearing as small copies of the parent and weighing around 200 g (7.1 oz). Zoologist Eric Guiler recorded its size at this time as follows: a crown-snout length of 5.87 cm (2.31 in), tail length of 5.78 cm (2.28 in), pes length 2.94 cm (1.16 in), manus 2.30 cm (0.91 in), shank 4.16 cm (1.64 in), forearm 4.34 cm (1.71 in) and crown-rump length is 11.9 cm (4.7 in). During this period, the devils lengthen at a roughly linear rate.

After being ejected, the devils stay outside the pouch, but they remain in the den for around another three months, first venturing outside the den between October and December before becoming independent in January. During this transitional phase out of the pouch, the young devils are relatively safe from predation as they are generally accompanied. When the mother is hunting they can stay inside a shelter or come along, often riding on their mother's back. During this time they continue to drink their mother's milk. Female devils are occupied with raising their young for all but approximately six weeks of the year. The milk contains a higher amount of iron than the milk of placental mammals. In Guiler's 1970 study, no females died while rearing their offspring in the pouch. After leaving the pouch, the devils grow by around 0.5 kg (1.1 lb) a month until they are six months old. While most pups will survive to be weaned, Guiler reported that up to three fifths of devils do not reach maturity. As juveniles are more crepuscular than adults, their appearance in the open during summer gives the impression to humans of a population boom. A study into the success of translocated devils that were orphaned and raised in captivity found that young devils who had consistently engaged with new experiences while they were in captivity survived better than young who had not.

== Conservation status ==
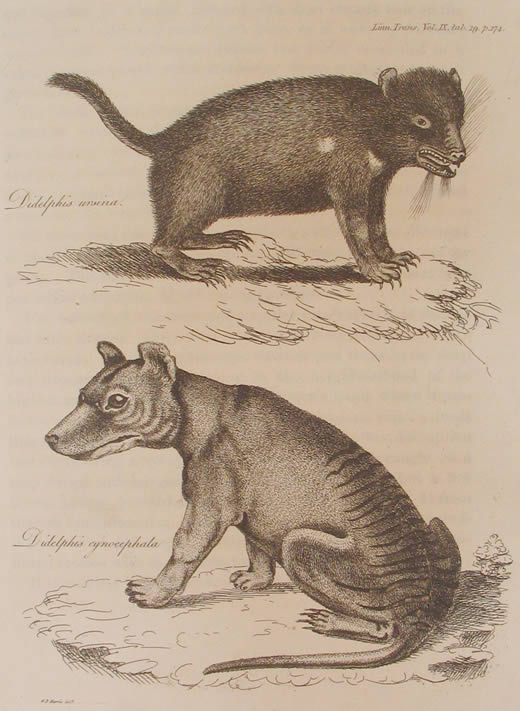
An 1808 impression featuring the Tasmanian devil and a thylacine by George Harris

The cause of the devil's disappearance from the mainland is unclear, but their decline seems to coincide with an abrupt change in climate and the expansion across the mainland of indigenous Australians and dingoes. However, whether it was direct hunting by people, competition with dingoes, changes brought about by the increasing human population, who by 3000 years ago were using all habitat types across the continent, or a combination of all three, is unknown; devils had coexisted with dingoes on the mainland for around 3000 years. Brown has also proposed that the El Niño–Southern Oscillation (ENSO) grew stronger during the Holocene, and that the devil, as a scavenger with a short life span, was highly sensitive to this. In dingo-free Tasmania, carnivorous marsupials were still active when Europeans arrived. The extermination of the thylacine after the arrival of the Europeans is well known, but the Tasmanian devil was threatened as well.

Habitat disruption can expose dens where mothers raise their young. This increases mortality, as the mother leaves the disturbed den with her pups clinging to her back, making them more vulnerable. Cancer in general is a common cause of death in devils. In 2008, high levels of potentially carcinogenic flame retardant chemicals were found in Tasmanian devils. Preliminary results of tests ordered by the Tasmanian government on chemicals found in fat tissue from 16 devils have revealed high levels of hexabromobiphenyl (BB153) and "reasonably high" levels of decabromodiphenyl ether (BDE209). The Save the Tasmanian Devil Appeal is the official fundraising entity for the Save the Tasmanian Devil Program. The priority is to ensure the survival of the Tasmanian devil in the wild.

=== Population declines ===
At least two major population declines, possibly due to disease epidemics, have occurred in recorded history: in 1909 and 1950. The devil was also reported as scarce in the 1850s. It is difficult to estimate the size of the devil population. In the mid-1990s, the population was estimated at 130,000–150,000 animals, but this is likely to have been an overestimate. The Tasmanian devil's population has been calculated in 2008 by Tasmania's Department of Primary Industries and Water as being in the range of 10,000 to 100,000 individuals, with 20,000 to 50,000 mature individuals being likely. Experts estimate that the devil has suffered a more than 80% decline in its population since the mid-1990s and that only around 10,000–15,000 remain in the wild as of 2008.

The species was listed as vulnerable under the Tasmanian Threatened Species Protection Act 1995 in 2005 and the Australian Environment Protection and Biodiversity Conservation Act 1999 in 2006, which means that it is at risk of extinction in the "medium term". The IUCN classified the Tasmanian devil in the lower risk/least concern category in 1996, but in 2009 they reclassified it as endangered. Appropriate wildlife refuges such as Savage River National Park in North West Tasmania provide hope for their survival.

=== Culling ===
The first European Tasmanian settlers ate Tasmanian devil, which they described as tasting like veal. As it was believed devils would hunt and kill livestock, possibly due to strong imagery of packs of devils eating weak sheep, a bounty scheme to remove the devil from rural properties was introduced as early as 1830. However, Guiler's research contended that the real cause of livestock losses was poor land management policies and feral dogs. In areas where the devil is now absent, poultry has continued to be killed by quolls. In earlier times, hunting possums and wallabies for fur was a big business—more than 900,000 animals were hunted in 1923—and this resulted in a continuation of bounty hunting of devils as they were thought to be a major threat to the fur industry, even though quolls were more adept at hunting the animals in question. Over the next 100 years, trapping and poisoning brought them to the brink of extinction.

After the death of the last thylacine in 1936, the Tasmanian devil was protected by law in June 1941 and the population slowly recovered. In the 1950s, with reports of increasing numbers, some permits to capture devils were granted after complaints of livestock damage. In 1966, poisoning permits were issued although attempts to have the animal unprotected failed. During this time environmentalists also became more outspoken, particularly as scientific studies provided new data suggesting the threat of devils to livestock had been vastly exaggerated. Numbers may have peaked in the early 1970s after a population boom; in 1975 they were reported to be lower, possibly due to overpopulation and consequent lack of food. Another report of overpopulation and livestock damage was reported in 1987. The following year, Trichinella spiralis, a parasite which kills animals and can infect humans, was found in devils and minor panic broke out before scientists assured the public that 30% of devils had it but that they could not transmit it to other species. Control permits were ended in the 1990s, but illegal killing continues to a limited extent, albeit "locally intense". This is not considered a substantial problem for the survival of the devil. Approximately 10,000 devils were killed per year in the mid-1990s. A selective culling program has taken place to remove individuals affected with DFTD, and has been shown to not slow the rate of disease progression or reduced the number of animals dying. A model has been tested to find out whether culling devils infected with DFTD would assist in the survival of the species, and it has found that culling would not be a suitable strategy to employ.

=== Road mortality ===
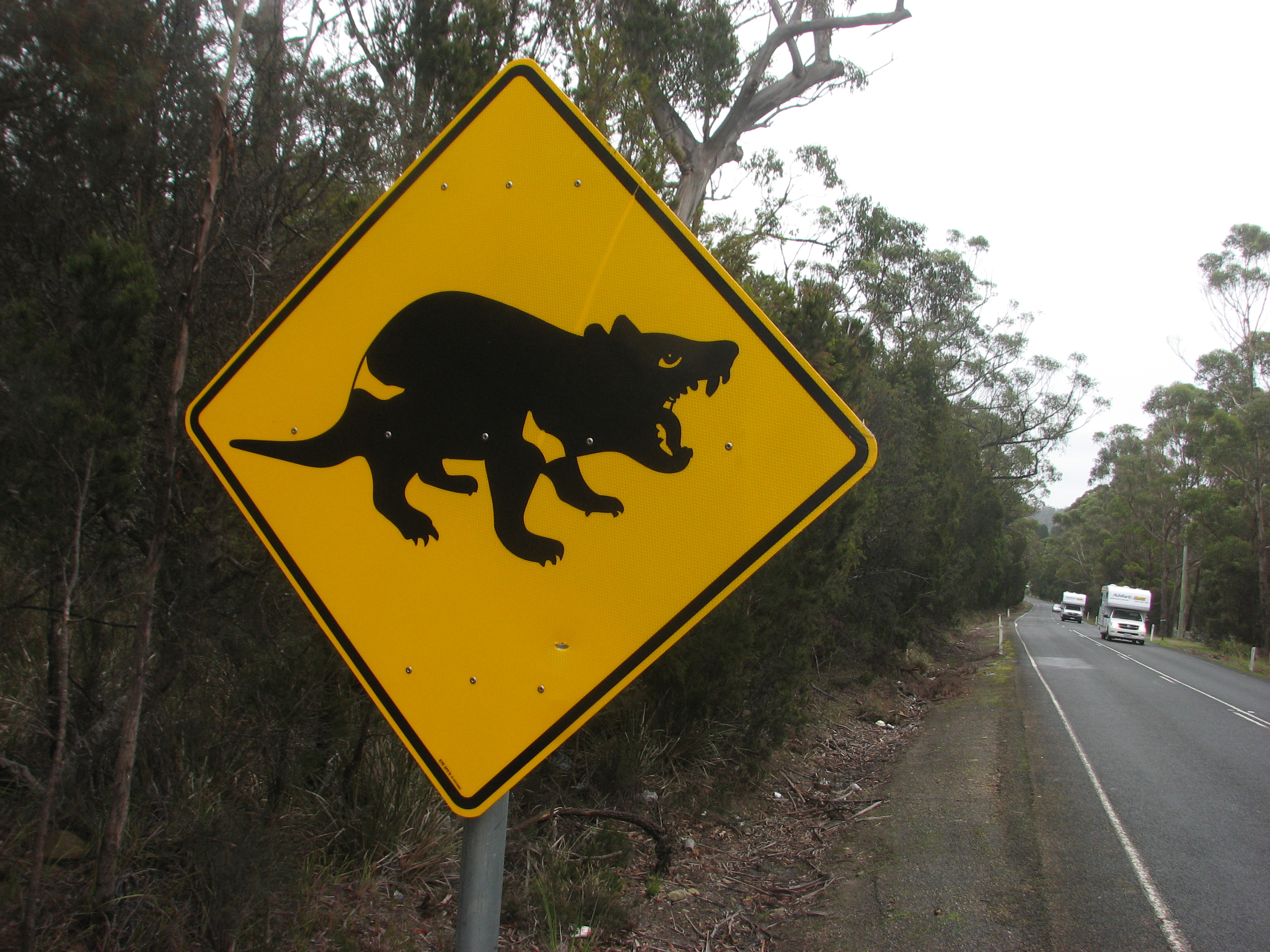
A road sign telling drivers that there may be devils nearby

Motor vehicles are a threat to localised populations of non-abundant Tasmanian mammals, and a 2010 study showed that devils were particularly vulnerable. A study of nine species, mostly marsupials of a similar size, showed that devils were more difficult for drivers to detect and avoid. At high beam, devils had the lowest detection distance, 40% closer than the median. This requires a 20% reduction in speed for a motorist to avoid the devil. For low beam, the devils had the second shortest detection distance, 16% below the median. For avoidance of roadkill to be feasible, motorists would have to drive at around half the current speed limit in rural areas. A study in the 1990s on a localised population of devils in a national park in Tasmania recorded a halving of the population after a hitherto gravel access road was upgraded, surfaced with bitumen and widened. At the same time, there was a large increase in deaths caused by vehicles along the new road; there had been none in the preceding six months.

The vast majority of deaths occurred in the sealed portion of the road, believed to be due to an increase in speeds. It was also conjectured that the animals were harder to see against the dark bitumen instead of the light gravel. The devil and quoll are especially vulnerable as they often try to retrieve roadkill for food and travel along the road. To alleviate the problem, traffic slowing measures, man-made pathways that offer alternative routes for devils, education campaigns, and the installation of light reflectors to indicate oncoming vehicles have been implemented. They are credited with decreases in roadkill. Devils have often been victims of roadkill when they are retrieving other roadkill. Work by scientist Menna Jones and a group of conservation volunteers to remove dead animals from the road resulted in a significant reduction in devil traffic deaths. It was estimated that 3,392 devils, or 3.8–5.7% of the population, were being killed annually by vehicles in 2001–2004. In 2009, the Save the Tasmanian Devil group launched the "Roadkill Project", which allowed members of the public to report sightings of devils which had been killed on the road. On 25 September 2015, 20 immunised devils were microchipped and released in Narawntapu National Park. By 5 October four had been hit by cars, prompting Samantha Fox, leader of Save the Tasmanian Devil, to describe roadkill as being the biggest threat to the Tasmanian devil after DFTD. A series of solar-powered alarms have been trialled that make noises and flash lights when cars are approaching, warning the animals. The trial ran for 18 months and the trial area had two-thirds less deaths than the control.

=== Devil facial tumour disease ===
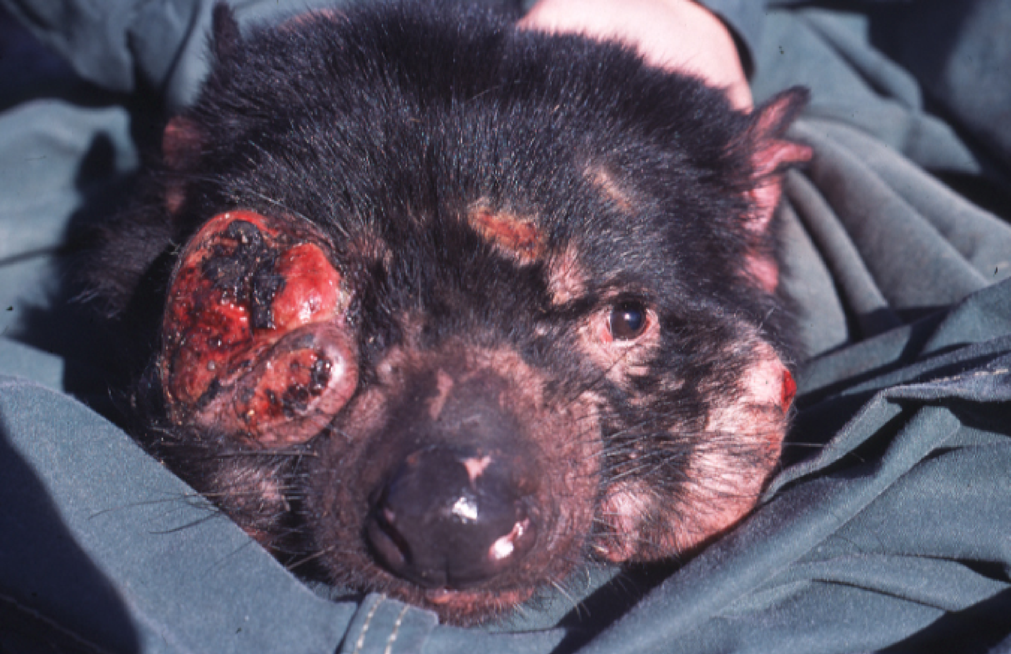
Devil facial tumour disease causes tumours to form in and around the mouth, interfering with feeding and eventually leading to death by starvation.

First seen in 1996 in Mount William in northeastern Tasmania, devil facial tumour disease (DFTD) has ravaged Tasmania's wild devils, and estimates of the impact range from 20% to as much as an 80% decline in the devil population, with over 65% of the state affected. The state's west coast area and far north-west are the only places where devils are tumour free. Individual devils die within months of infection. The disease is an example of transmissible cancer, which means that it is contagious and passed from one animal to another. This tumour is able to pass between hosts without inducing a response from the host's immune system. Dominant devils who engage in more biting behaviour are more exposed to the disease.

Wild Tasmanian devil populations are being monitored to track the spread of the disease and to identify changes in disease prevalence. Field monitoring involves trapping devils within a defined area to check for the presence of the disease and determine the number of affected animals. The same area is visited repeatedly to characterise the spread of the disease over time. So far, it has been established that the short-term effects of the disease in an area can be severe. Long-term monitoring at replicated sites will be essential to assess whether these effects remain, or whether populations can recover. Field workers are also testing the effectiveness of disease suppression by trapping and removing diseased devils. It is hoped that the removal of diseased devils from wild populations should decrease disease prevalence and allow more devils to survive beyond their juvenile years and breed. In March 2017, scientists at the University of Tasmania presented an apparent first report of having successfully treated Tasmanian devils with the disease. Live cancer cells that were treated with IFN-γ to restore MHC-I expression, were injected into the infected devils to stimulate their immune system to recognise and fight the disease. In 2020 it was reported that one of the last DFTD-free wild population of Tasmanian devils was suffering from inbreeding depression and has undergone a significant decline in reproductive success in recent years.

== Relationship with humans ==
At Lake Nitchie in western New South Wales in 1970, a male human skeleton wearing a necklace of 178 teeth from 49 different devils was found. The skeleton is estimated to be 7000 years old, and the necklace is believed to be much older than the skeleton. Archaeologist Josephine Flood believes the devil was hunted for its teeth and that this contributed to its extinction on mainland Australia. Owen and Pemberton note that few such necklaces have been found. Middens that contain devil bones are rare—two notable examples are Devil's Lair in the south-western part of Western Australia and Tower Hill in Victoria. In Tasmania, local Indigenous Australians and devils sheltered in the same caves. Tasmanian Aboriginal names for the devil recorded by Europeans include "tarrabah", "poirinnah", and "par-loo-mer-rer". Variations also exist, such as "Taraba" and "purinina".

It is a common belief that devils will eat humans. While they are known to eat dead bodies, there are prevalent myths that they eat living humans who wander into the bush. Despite outdated beliefs and exaggerations regarding their disposition, many, although not all, devils will remain still when in the presence of a human; some will also shake nervously. They can bite and scratch out of fear when held by a human, but a firm grip will cause them to remain still. Although they can be tamed, they are asocial and are not considered appropriate as pets; they have an unpleasant odour, and neither demonstrate nor respond to affection.

Until recently, the devil was not studied much by academics and naturalists. At the start of the 20th century, Hobart zoo operator Mary Roberts, who was not a trained scientist, was credited for changing people's attitudes and encouraging scientific interest in native animals such as the devil that were seen as fearsome and abhorrent, and the human perception of the animal changed. Theodore Thomson Flynn was the first professor of biology in Tasmania, and carried out some research during the period around World War I. In the mid-1960s, Professor Guiler assembled a team of researchers and started a decade of systematic fieldwork on the devil. This is seen as the start of modern scientific study of it. However, the devil was still negatively depicted, including in tourism material. The first doctorate awarded for research into the devil came in 1991.

=== In captivity ===
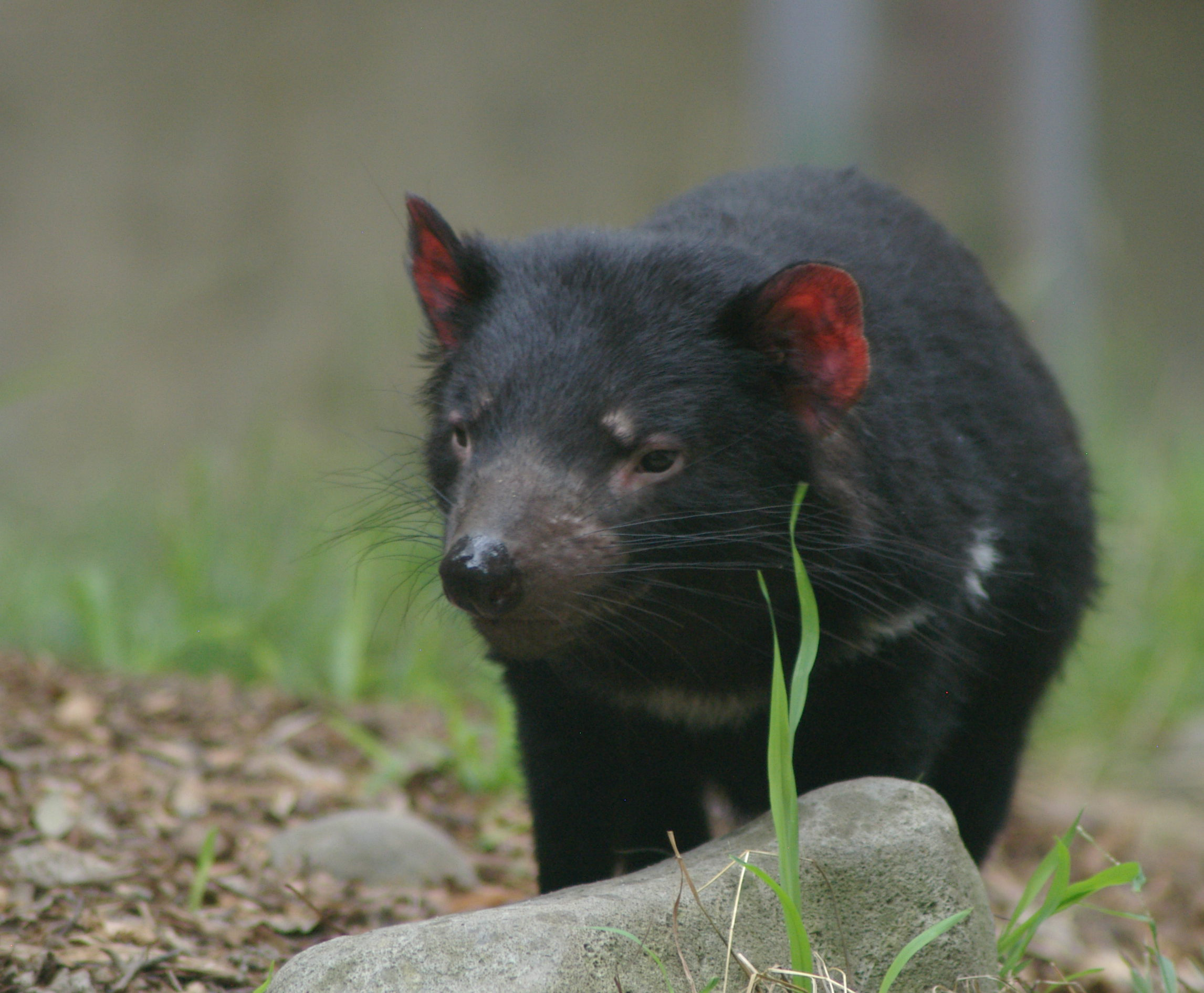
At Healesville Sanctuary, Victoria

Early attempts to breed Tasmanian devils in captivity had limited success. Mary Roberts bred a pair at Beaumaris Zoo (which she named Billy and Truganini) in 1913. However, although advised to remove Billy, Roberts found Truganini too distressed by his absence, and returned him. The first litter was presumed eaten by Billy, but a second litter in 1914 survived, after Billy was removed. Roberts wrote an article on keeping and breeding the devils for the London Zoological Society. Even by 1934, successful breeding of the devil was rare. In a study on the growth of young devils in captivity, some developmental stages were very different from those reported by Guiler. The pinnae were free on day 36, and eyes opened later, on days 115–121. In general, females tend to retain more stress after being taken into captivity than males.

Tasmanian devils were displayed in various zoos around the world from the 1850s onwards. In the 1950s several animals were given to European zoos. In October 2005 the Tasmanian government sent four devils, two male and two female, to the Copenhagen Zoo, following the birth of the first son of King Frederik X of Denmark and his Tasmanian-born wife Mary. Due to restrictions on their export by the Australian government, at the time these were the only devils known to be living outside Australia. In June 2013, due to the successes of the insurance population program, it was planned to send devils to other zoos around the world in a pilot program. San Diego Zoo Wildlife Alliance and Albuquerque Biopark were selected to participate in the program, and Wellington Zoo and Auckland Zoo soon followed. In the United States, four additional zoos have since been selected as part of the Australian government's Save the Tasmanian Devil program, the zoos selected were: the Fort Wayne Children's Zoo, the Los Angeles Zoo, the Saint Louis Zoo, and the Toledo Zoo. Captive devils are usually forced to stay awake during the day to cater to visitors, rather than following their natural nocturnal style.

=== In popular culture ===
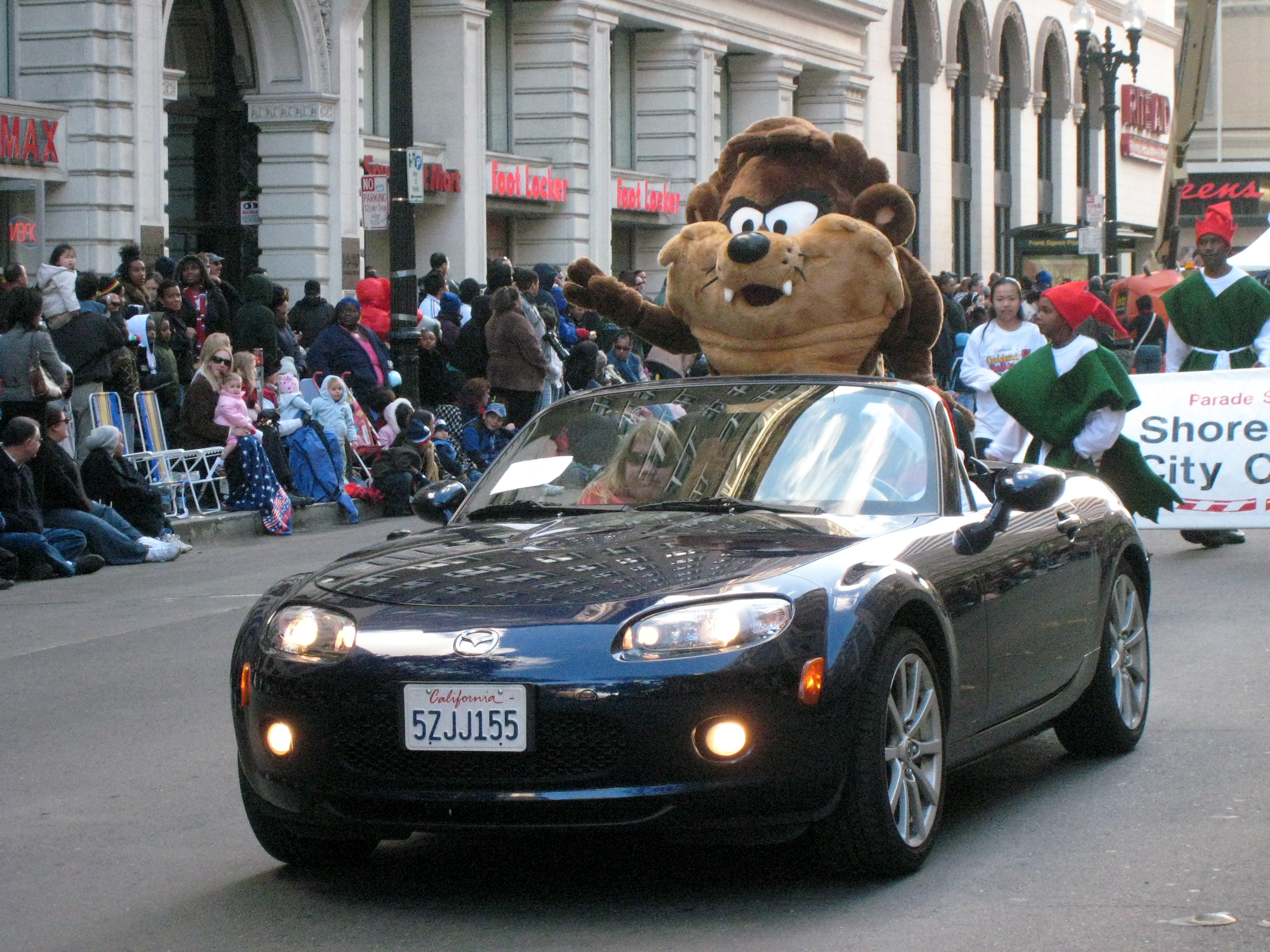
Warner Bros' Tasmanian Devil "Taz" at a parade in California

The devil is an iconic animal within Australia, and particularly associated with Tasmania. The animal is used as the emblem of the Tasmanian National Parks and Wildlife Service, and the former Tasmanian Australian rules football team which played in the Victorian Football League was known as the Devils. The Hobart Devils were once part of the National Basketball League. The devil has appeared on several commemorative coins in Australia over the years. Cascade Brewery in Tasmania sells a ginger beer with a Tasmanian devil on the label. In 2015, the Tasmanian devil was chosen as Tasmania's state emblem.

Tasmanian devils are popular with tourists, and the director of the Tasmanian Devil Conservation Park has described their possible extinction as "a really significant blow for Australian and Tasmanian tourism". There has also been a multimillion-dollar proposal to build a giant 19 m-high, 35 m-long devil in Launceston in northern Tasmania as a tourist attraction. Devils began to be used as ecotourism in the 1970s, when studies showed that the animals were often the only things known about Tasmania overseas, and suggested that they should therefore be the centrepiece of marketing efforts, resulting in some devils being taken on promotional tours.

The Tasmanian devil is probably best known internationally as the inspiration for the Looney Tunes cartoon character the Tasmanian Devil, or "Taz" in 1954. Little known at the time, the loud hyperactive cartoon character has little in common with the real life animal. After a few shorts between 1957 and 1964, the character was retired until the 1990s, when he gained his own show, Taz-Mania, and again became popular. In 1997, a newspaper report noted that Warner Bros. had "trademarked the character and registered the name Tasmanian Devil", and that this trademark "was policed", including an eight-year legal case to allow a Tasmanian company to call a fishing lure "Tasmanian Devil". Debate followed, and a delegation from the Tasmanian government met with Warner Bros. Ray Groom, the Tourism Minister, later announced that a "verbal agreement" had been reached. An annual fee would be paid to Warner Bros. in return for the Government of Tasmania being able to use the image of Taz for "marketing purposes". This agreement later disappeared. In 2006, Warner Bros. permitted the Government of Tasmania to sell stuffed toys of Taz with profits funnelled into research on DFTD.

== See also ==
- Fauna of Australia
- Threatened fauna of Australia
- List of adaptive radiated marsupials by form
