= Pierre Boitard =

French botanist and geologist (1789-1859)

- Born: 27 April 1789
- Died: 25 August 1859 (aged 70)

Pierre Boitard (French pronunciation: [pjɛʁ bwataʁ]; 27 April 1789 Mâcon, Saône-et-Loire – 25 August 1859) was a French botanist and geologist.

As well as describing and classifying the Tasmanian devil, he is notable for his fictional natural history Paris avant les hommes (Paris Before Man), published posthumously in 1861, which described a prehistoric ape-like human ancestor living in the region of Paris. He also wrote Curiosités d'histoire naturelle et astronomie amusante, Réalités fantastiques, Voyages dans les planètes, Manuel du naturaliste préparateur ou l’art d’empailler les animaux et de conserver les végétaux et les minéraux, Manuel d'entomologie etc.
