= Fort Wayne Zoo =

Nonprofit zoo in Fort Wayne, Indiana, U.S.

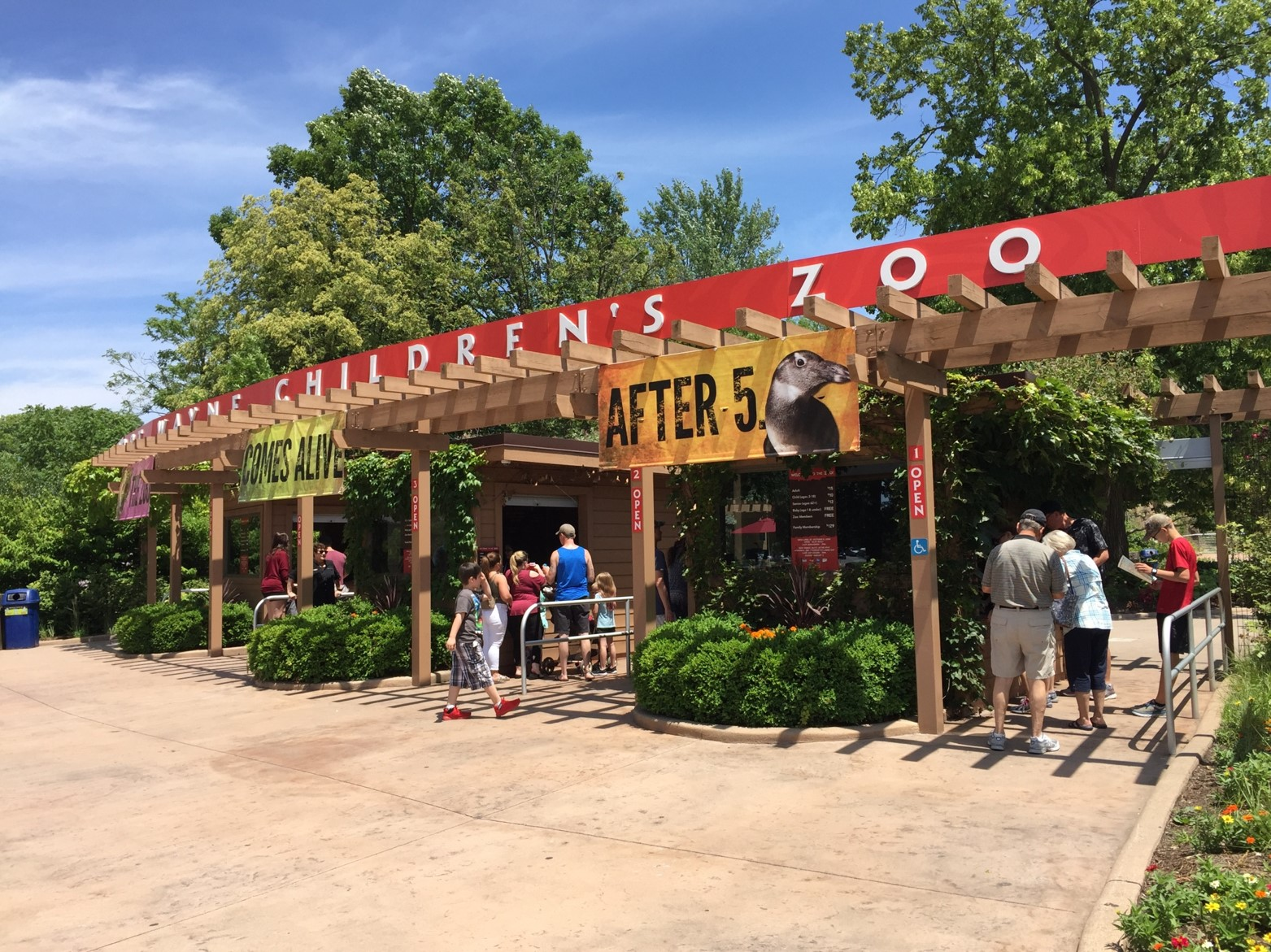
- Entrance plaza
- Interactive map of Fort Wayne Zoo
- 41°6′23″N 85°9′16.25″W
- Date opened: July 3, 1965
- Location: Fort Wayne, Indiana, United States
- Land area: 40 acres (16 ha)
- No. of animals: 1,000
- No. of species: 200
- Memberships: AZA
- Major exhibits: African Lion, Rain Forest Room, Giraffe Feeding Station, Indiana Family Farm, Orangutan Valley, Coastal Cove, Stingray Bay, The Reef, Tiger Forest, Red Panda Ridge
- Director: Rick Schuiteman
- Public transit: Citilink
- Website: fwzoo.com

The Fort Wayne Zoo is a zoo in Fort Wayne, Indiana, United States and is the largest accredited Zoo in Indiana. Since opening in 1965, the 1,000-animal zoo has been located on 40 acres (16 ha) in Fort Wayne's Franke Park. The Fort Wayne Zoo is operated by the non-profit Fort Wayne Zoological Society under a cooperative agreement with the Fort Wayne Parks and Recreation Department. The zoo receives no tax funding for operations and operates solely on earned revenue and donations.

The zoo, originally named the Franke Park Zoo became the Fort Wayne Children's Zoo upon opening in 1965. On January 1, 2025, the zoo become known as the Fort Wayne Zoo.

The Zoo's Mission: Connecting People and Animals, Strengthening Families and Inspiring People to Care.

The zoo continuously ranks among the top zoos in the U.S. In 2015, TripAdvisor named it the seventh best zoo in the nation.

== History ==
The zoo can trace its origins to 1952 when 54 acres (22 ha) were added to Franke Park in Fort Wayne, Indiana, to establish a nature preserve. Local popularity of the preserve led to Fort Wayne officials deciding to build a full-fledged zoo by 1962. The zoo's mission was to educate children about animals.

On July 3, 1965, the new Fort Wayne Children's Zoo opened on 5.5 acres (2.2 ha) with 18 animal exhibits. Earl Wells was the original Zoo Director. In 1976, a major expansion of the zoo was the African Veldt attraction, where savanna animals grazed in open fields east of the Central Zoo. In 1987, the Australian Adventure premiered, showcasing animals from the Outback. A domed Indonesian Rain Forest exhibit opened in 1994, with Orangutan Valley opening a year later, and Tiger Forest in 1996.

On October 19, 2004, five wildebeests broke through a gate and jumped a fence, roaming the streets of a nearby neighborhood. Eventually, the wildebeests were captured, though two of them suffered broken legs and were forced to be euthanized. The zoo was fined $825 for the incident.

On November 2, 2007, artificial rocks made of Styrofoam caught fire in the zoo's new African Journey expansion, the largest project in the zoo's 42-year history. The fire happened where workers were constructing an African lion exhibit, the centerpiece of the new expansion. Thick black plumes of smoke billowing from the site of the fire were clearly visible across the skies of Fort Wayne and much of the region. No workers or animals were harmed in the blaze.

On July 1, 2015, the zoo celebrated its 50th anniversary with about 400 guests. The 47th Three Rivers Festival parade honored the occasion, with the theme "Here's to Zoo".

On March 3, 2020, the zoo announced that longtime Executive Director Jim Anderson would retire at the end of the 2020 season. Anderson has served as the zoo's executive director since 1994, when he succeeded its founding executive director, Earl Wells. On September 1, 2020, the Board of Directors announced Rick Schuiteman from SeaWorld San Diego would replace Anderson as only the third executive director.

On February 4, 2021, the zoo announced two of its Sumatran tigers tested positive for COVID-19. Both cats were showing mild signs of a dry cough, triggering animal care experts to take notice. Fecal samples for both tigers, Bugara and Indah, were collected for testing and performed in veterinary laboratories. The tigers recovered without incident.

On March 15, 2022, the zoo announced their support of Ukrainian Zoos, during the Russian War, by contributing $5,000 from their Conservation Fund to go directly to the EAZA to support Zoo animals and keeper staff.

On April 21, 2023, the zoo announced the Indonesian Rainforest area would be reimagined and renamed to Asian Trek allowing the zoo to add new species to the space and expand the footprint to include Bamboo Forest and Red Panda Ridge.

On December 10, 2024, Zoo Director Schuiteman announced it would no longer be called the Fort Wayne Children's Zoo, but instead, the Fort Wayne Zoo beginning January 1, 2025.

== Exhibits ==
The zoo consists of several self-contained biomes themed as different regions of the world.

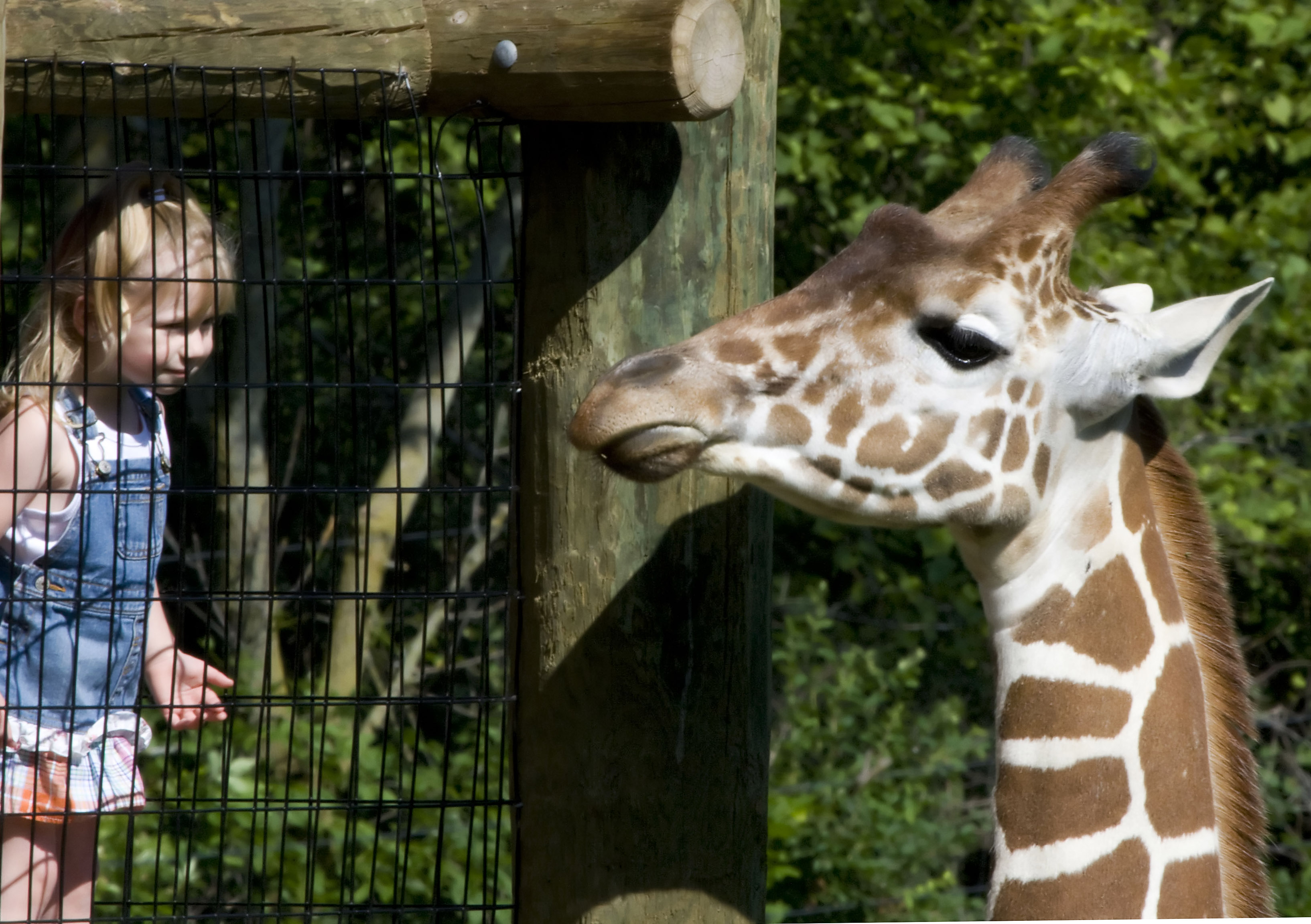
Reticulated giraffe in the zoo's African Journey exhibit

The African Journey opened to the public June 6, 2009, on the former site of the African Veldt. The $9 million African Journey is currently the largest expansion in the FWCZ's history, featuring an African lion exhibit, African Village, interactive cultural center, reticulated giraffe feeding area, Safari Trail, plains zebras and wildebeest, new animal exhibits: (banded mongooses, Rüppell's griffon vultures, the Kirk's dik-dik and spotted hyenas, honey badgers, bat-eared foxes, great white pelicans, and servals), Amur leopards and a group educational and picnic area. The Sky Safari, a ski lift-like ride, gives riders an aerial view of the Serengeti-based landscape.

The former Australian Adventure area opened with Australia After Dark exhibit, featuring nocturnal animals native to Australia such as bats, short-beaked echidnas, and owls. A separate building held a 20,000-gallon aquarium containing the Sharks, Rays, and Jellyfish Exhibit, as well as a model coral reef with tropical fish. In the Kangaroo Walkabout, a roped path lead through an open area of eastern grey kangaroos, which may cross the path at their leisure. The dingo exhibit held a mating pair and produced and housed a new litter of dingo pups in 2012. An aviary featured birds native to Australia. There were other assorted exhibits, and a Dugout Canoe Ride where you could view the Australian Adventure from a canal.

The new Australian Adventure is roughly the same, except a stingray exhibit replacing Australia After Dark and a new Aquarium (both accessed by a new plaza), and several other new buildings, including a new exhibit for Tasmanian devils. The Stingray Exhibit also offers daily feeding where guests can feed them for a nominal charge.

The Central Zoo includes assorted animals from the Americas and a few from other regions, including Canada lynxes, ring-tailed lemurs, African penguins, North American river otters, Aldabra tortoises, American alligators and macaws and two toed sloths. Monkey Island contains a family of Panamanian white-faced capuchins. Indian peafowl roam freely throughout the farm. Also located in the Central Zoo is a duck pond.

Coastal Cove, opened in 2025, is the major attraction and home to California sea lions and harbor seals. This newly themed area includes a large rocky shores habitat, sunning beaches, and guest viewing gallary along with an iconic Westcoast lighthouse. Sea Lion presentations occur periodically throughout the day. Sea Lion Wild Encounters are offered for guests to enter the habitat and interact with the animals.

The Indiana Family Farm expands from the old petting zoo area, which contained only goats, wild turkeys, ravens, chickens, and white-tailed deer. Now a model barn and farmhouse, as well as signs from the point of view of children living on a farm, lend atmosphere. Horses, sheep, rabbits, calves, and others are all contained in open stalls and may be petted by visitors. Barn mice and other small animals can be viewed. Goats reside in an open paddock which visitors can enter, and, for a price, feed the goats pellets from ice cream cones and milk from bottles, or brush them for free. This area is considered part of the Central Zoo and is located directly before the exit. The Wild Things Gift Shop at the exit was recently expanded.

The Asian Trek, formerly known as the Indonesian Rainforest, features Sumatran orangutans, Sumatran tigers, Komodo dragons, reticulated pythons, clouded leopards, red pandas, assorted birds, mammals, and primates, as well as a domed area (Domeaviary) containing birds, fish, reptiles, and, until recently, butterflies. The domeaviary allows visitors to experience the sights, sounds, and feel of a rain forest. This area also has an Endangered Species Carousel.

A Baby Story

Early in the morning of Saturday, November 22, 2014, Tara, a 19-year-old Sumatran orangutan, whose pregnancy was announced in October 2014 (orangutans are critically endangered), gave birth to a healthy female baby. The baby's father is a 28-year-old male named Tengku. Tengku arrived in Fort Wayne in 1995, from Zoo Atlanta, and Tara arrived in 2013 from the Columbus Zoo; orangutan gestation is normally 245 days. Though Tara had never given birth before and had never observed other females of her species caring for their offspring, Fort Wayne officials, having observed her after the birth, are cautiously optimistic, having prepared for these potential obstacles when, after agreeing to try and breed them on the recommendation of the Association of Zoos and Aquariums' Orangutan Species Survival Plan program, they formulated a detailed Birth Management Plan.

The baby orangutan, named Asmara, who was born on November 22, 2014, has made Orangutan Valley a popular destination in the zoo, as guests can frequently spot her and her mother Tara in the enclosure. The other adult male orangutan in this facility is named Owen who is a hybrid orangutan and not under any breeding recommendations, thus he is spayed. He also serves a role as a father figure to Asmara.

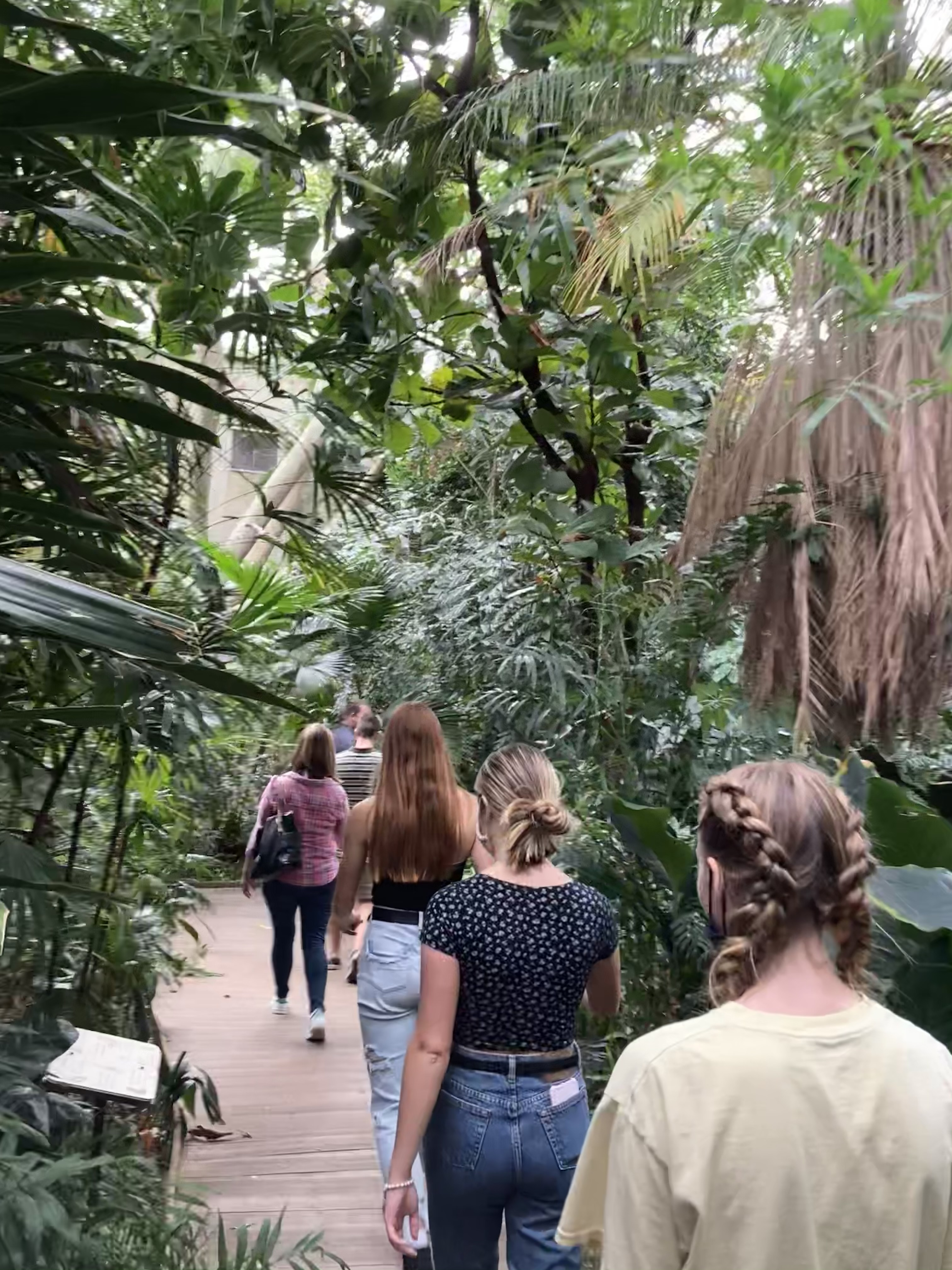
Guests walking through the rain forest dome aviary

== Other attractions ==
- Sky Safari over Africa
- Z.O.& O Railroad train leaving the Central Zoo through Franke Park
- Crocodile Creek Adventure Ride in Australian Adventure
- Endangered Species Carousel Ride in Asian Trek
- Nature Play in Africa
- Bamboo Maze in Red Panda Ridge
- Swan Paddle Boats on the pond
- Adventure Play in Asian Trek – a two-story rope swing course for all ages
- Animal Feeding Opportunities including Goat, Chicken, Stingray, and Sitatunga.

== Conservation ==
The zoo works with over 30 conservation partners around the globe. The zoo breeds endangered animals and participates in over 56 Species Survival Plan programs.

== Education programs ==
The Fort Wayne Zoo has educational programs for all ages. Programs include in-zoo programs and in-class visits by zoo educators and animals. The zoo also has a busy summer season, hosting almost 2,000 children from K–12 in summer camps. The Teens for Nature program, for 7th–12th graders, helps teens focus on nature, animals, conservation, and leadership. Over 300 teens volunteer to be a part of the program.

== See also ==
- List of zoos in the United States
- List of WAZA member zoos and aquariums
