= Goulds Country, Tasmania =

Goulds Country Tasmania
- Coordinates: 41°15′02″S 148°03′27″E
- Population: 77 (2016 census)
- Postcode(s): 7216
- Location: 21 km (13 mi) NW of St Helens
- LGA(s): Break O'Day
- Region: North-east
- State electorate(s): Lyons
- Federal division(s): Lyons
Localities around Goulds Country:
Pioneer	Gladstone	Ansons Bay
Lottah, Weldborough	Goulds Country	Goshen
Pyengana	Goshen	Goshen

Goulds Country is a rural locality in the local government area (LGA) of Break O'Day in the North-east LGA region of Tasmania. The locality is about 21 kilometres (13 mi) north-west of the town of St Helens and 147 kilometres (91 mi) east of the city of Launceston. The 2016 census recorded a population of 77 for the state suburb of Goulds Country.

== History ==
Goulds Country was gazetted as a locality in 1969.

The area was previously a tin mining town known as Dumara or Kunnarra.

== Geography ==
The George River forms part of the southern boundary. The Great Musselroe River rises in the locality and flows through to the north. The Groom river runs in the south from the east to the west border and goes past the Tasman highway for most of the journey.

== Road infrastructure ==
Route A3 (Tasman Highway) passes through from south-west to south-east. Route C841 (Terrys Hill Road / Counsels Road) starts at an intersection with A3 on the south-east boundary, and runs north outside the eastern boundary before passing through the north-east corner.
