= Eddystone, Tasmania =

Eddystone Tasmania
- Coordinates: 40°59′35″S 148°20′49″E
- Population: nil (2016 census)
- Postcode(s): 7264
- Location: 53 km (33 mi) N of St Helens
- LGA(s): Break O'Day
- Region: North-east
- State electorate(s): Lyons
- Federal division(s): Lyons
Localities around Eddystone:
Mount William National Park	Mount William National Park	Tasman Sea
Mount William National Park	Eddystone	Tasman Sea
Ansons Bay	Ansons Bay	Tasman Sea

Eddystone is a rural locality in the local government area of Break O'Day in the North-east region of Tasmania. It is located about 53 kilometres (33 mi) north of the town of St Helens. The 2016 census determined a population of nil for the state suburb of Eddystone.

== History ==
Eddystone is a confirmed suburb/locality. Eddystone Point, the eastern extremity of the locality, supports a lighthouse and is known to Aboriginals as Larapuna. In 2006 the Tasmanian Government issued a 40-year lease for the Larapuna lands surrounding the lighthouse.

== Geography ==
The Tasman Sea forms the north-eastern, eastern and south-eastern boundaries.

== Road infrastructure ==
The C846 route (Eddystone Point Road) enters from the west and runs through to Eddystone Point, where it ends.
