= Marsupial lawn =

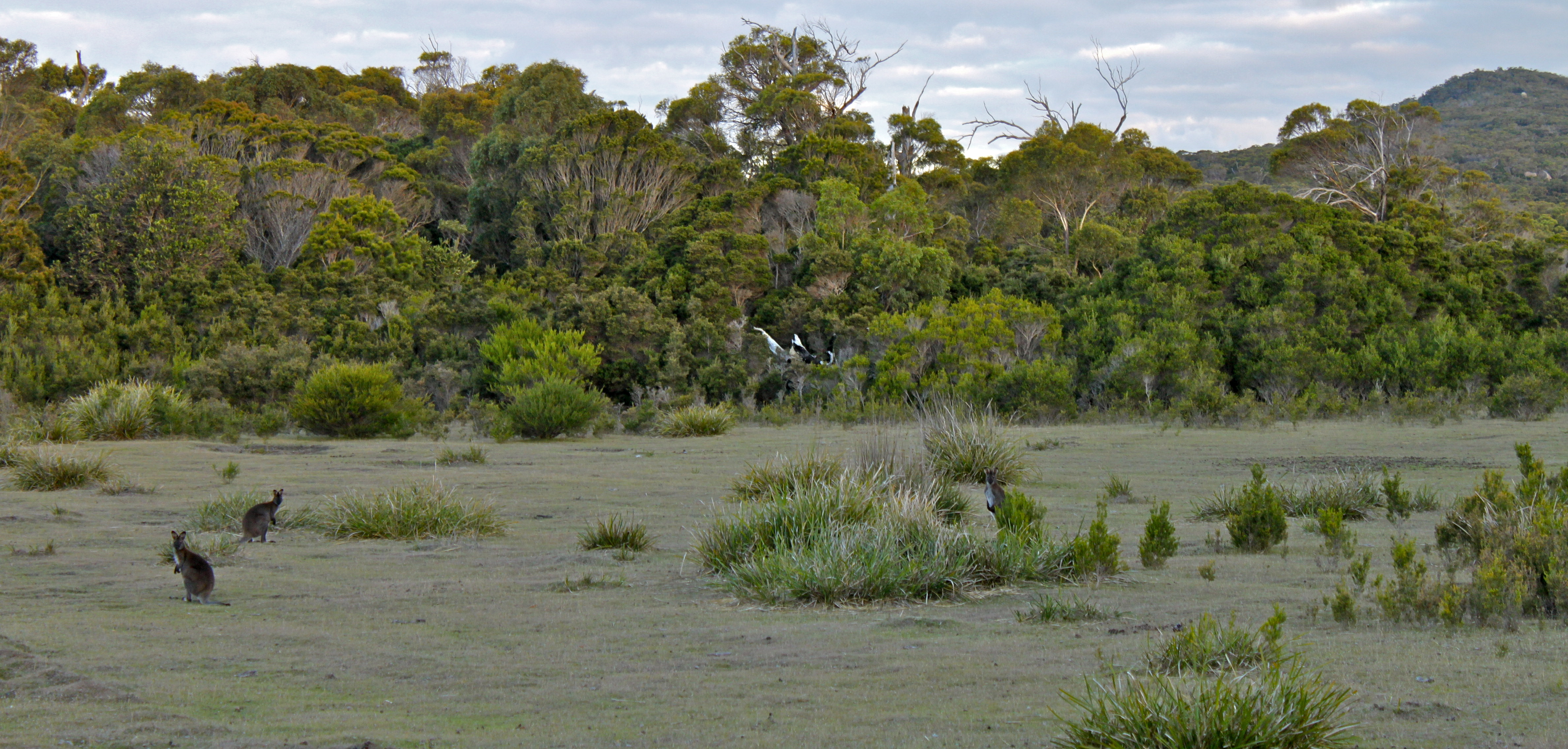
A marsupial lawn at Mount William National Park

Marsupial lawns are portions of land where the soil moisture is much higher than in the vegetation surrounding it. These high moisture levels create lawns that attract a large amount of grazing by marsupials. Commonly found in Tasmania, the lawns function as habitats for local animals.

== Background/history ==
Similar turfs have been discovered in New Zealand that are maintained by small mammals such as rabbits or sheep. Similar patterns of feeding and use have been recorded in both New Zealand and Tasmania. These lawns are also similar to the famous mammalian lawns of Serengeti. In Tasmania, the lawns form sporadically within woody landscapes as well as sheltered areas along the coast. They are found at altitudes ranging from alpine to coastal, and are often associated with wetlands.

Marsupial lawns are also frequently found behind dunes along the eastern coast. Coastal shores are often lined with tea-tree, banksias, and eucalypts, marshes and marsupial lawns in sheltered areas where mud can slowly accumulate. The lawns can only evolve from constant grazing. The Bay of Fires is a common tourist area for visitors to view the various land structures and forms, including marsupial lawns.

Along with their habitats in woody forests and behind sand dunes, indigenous marsupials patrol domestic lawns nightly. The animals chew off any growth in the grass from the previous night. Fire risk is reduced by this frequent trimming, and the soil remains fertilized and conditioned by fecal matter the marsupials leave behind. Many farmers have found that using the marsupials to aid their plants works great. They allow the marsupials to come in at night and trim grasses in their gardens. This also reveals weeds or other shrubs, making extraction of unwanted plants easier. The marsupials leave vegetables and fruits alone while focusing only on eating grass. While this may be beneficial to crop farmers, others are frustrated with constant efforts to keep marsupials out of their grass cattle pastures. Expensive fencing and repair to keep marsupials out of pastures has caused much controversy.

Marsupial lawns have become home for many of Tasmania's animals, marsupials in particular. The most prevalent of these animals in the lawns are known as the Big Five. They are the forester kangaroo, the Bennett's wallaby, the Tasmanian pademelon, the common wombat, and the Tasmanian devil.

== Role of grazing ==
Environmental observations and enclosure experiments have been used to test whether vertebrate grazers are a critical element in maintaining marsupial lawns, or if water inundation played a larger role in formation. Results have shown that both woody and non-woody plants became much taller in the lawns when marsupial grazers were excluded, while the inundation had no effect on woody growth. This shows that marsupials are essential to maintaining lawns, and without them the structure of the lawns would deteriorate.

== Human impacts ==
Local human activity can have a profound influence on the factors affecting marsupial lawn creation and sustainment. In addition to altering these variables, humans also destroy lawn habitat through farming and livestock grazing. In order for these lawns to flourish, natural grazing patterns and fire cycles must be maintained. Humans are encroaching on marsupials' habitat and altering fire patterns, meaning that Australia's marsupial lawns are under threat.

Land use changes such as farming and grazing are one of the biggest threats for marsupial lawns. These lawns are prime areas for agricultural use because they are naturally located in areas of high soil moisture and nutrient content. This can be attributed to natural topography and rainfall patterns. In contrast, much of the rest of Australia's tropical savannas experience sporadic rainfall, meaning they can support very little vegetation growth. As a result, while marsupial lawns are able to cope with small scale disturbances, such as roads or power lines, when large tracts of lawn are destroyed, there is nowhere for the animals or plants to migrate to. Furthermore, herbivore grazing is essential to prevent the invasion of woody species into the lawns. Therefore, destruction of large herbivorous marsupial habitat will in turn negatively affect lawn growth. Decreased agricultural production in the 21st century has resulted in pressure to develop these economically valuable areas, and it is important that such development is undertaken in a way that acknowledges the value of this unique ecosystem.

=== Impact of the cattle industry ===
With the acceleration of the Australian cattle industry over the past decade, Australian geography has undergone serious environmental changes which have affected marsupial lawns. Australia is the second largest beef exporter in the world and the cattle industry its largest agricultural sector. Increasing beef demand expanded the size of farms and numbers of livestock into areas previously unsuitable for sustained pasture farming. Since Australian farmers use irrigation to water crops and nourish animals, dry landscape can be converted into fertile soil.

Changing the environment from desert to grassland extends fertile land into herbivore habitat. Marsupials that once scavenged the dry deserts for scarce grasses and sparse leafy shrubs now find an abundance of vegetation, particularly in areas being farmed. With this large amount of resources now available, marsupials, have been able to reproduce more than ever before. Most cattle are free range, yet a few are fenced in by a three line barbed wire fence that red kangaroos have no problem jumping over to feed on irrigated grasses. Farmers also erect agricultural settlements near rivers or flood-outs. Although farms may be in the desert, these oases can provide the water for an entire crop or herd if managed correctly. Marsupials use these creeks and flood-outs as natural habitats; however, once farmers irrigate these bodies of water, their habitats are extended. Instead of feeding on dry grass with low nourishment, kangaroos and other marsupials seek the plush grasses growing off irrigated moist soil. As farmers continue to use these methods, the marsupial population will continue to increase.

However, while some agricultural development has enabled kangaroos to expand their population in the harsh conditions of arid Australia, other human developments pose problems to these marsupials. For example, many farmers have reported seeing kangaroos drowning in the watering holes of free-range cattle. As the cows drink and wallow in the ponds, the desert clay becomes an adhesive substance. When kangaroos come to replenish themselves in the ponds they sink into the inescapable goo and die from starvation or heat stroke.

== Role of fire on lawns ==
In addition to grazing, fires have a significant effect on the health of marsupial lawns. One of the defining characteristics of lawns is a lack of woody plants. Fires play an important role in the creation and maintenance of these habitats because fires curtail woody plants, and return nutrients to the soil to allow for future growth. Human-caused fires have contrasting effects on marsupial lawns. On one hand, they are often set by indigenous people who use the fires to concentrate marsupials for hunting, which in turn results in lower lawn grazing and more woody plant growth. On the other hand, these fires destroy woody plants and allow grass to grow in its place, which increases potential marsupial lawn area. Consequently, fire suppression efforts may prevent some lawns from getting the woody growth pruning they needs, causing brush buildup. When such areas finally do burn, they can become hot enough to reduce the viability of the soil for years.

== Potential effects of climate change ==
In addition to local impacts such as land use and fire management, global issues such as climate change also have the potential to impact marsupial lawn ecosystems. Because of the scope of the predicted changes, global warming has the ability to affect precipitation levels, temperature, and fire cycles in Australia. This in turn will alter where and to what extent marsupial lawns can exist. However, currently it is not possible to predict whether or not climate change will increase or decrease the total acreage of marsupial lawns.

Climate models predict that northern Australia may see slightly increased rainfall in the coming decades. However, the precipitation may be less reliable, and as a result there may be long periods of drought or at the very least a longer dry season each year. In addition, climate change will bring with it higher overall temperatures, as well as continually elevating levels of carbon dioxide (CO_{2}). Preliminary research shows that higher temperatures, higher rainfall, and elevated CO_{2} levels may lead to increased woody plant growth. This in turn would decrease marsupial lawn habitat. However, higher temperatures and a long dry season mean increased fire frequency, which could serve to offset the new woody growth. To further complicate matters, it is possible that the higher levels of evaporation brought on by increased temperatures could compensate for the increased rainfall. However, research has not been done to determine whether higher precipitation or higher temperatures will have a greater effect on water availability in the region.

The overall effect of climate change on marsupial lawns, and the greater northern Australia area, is needed to be studied in greater detail. Currently the counteracting and overlapping effects make it difficult to discern the overall impact human induced climate change will have on marsupial lawns.
