= Ansons Bay =

- Town
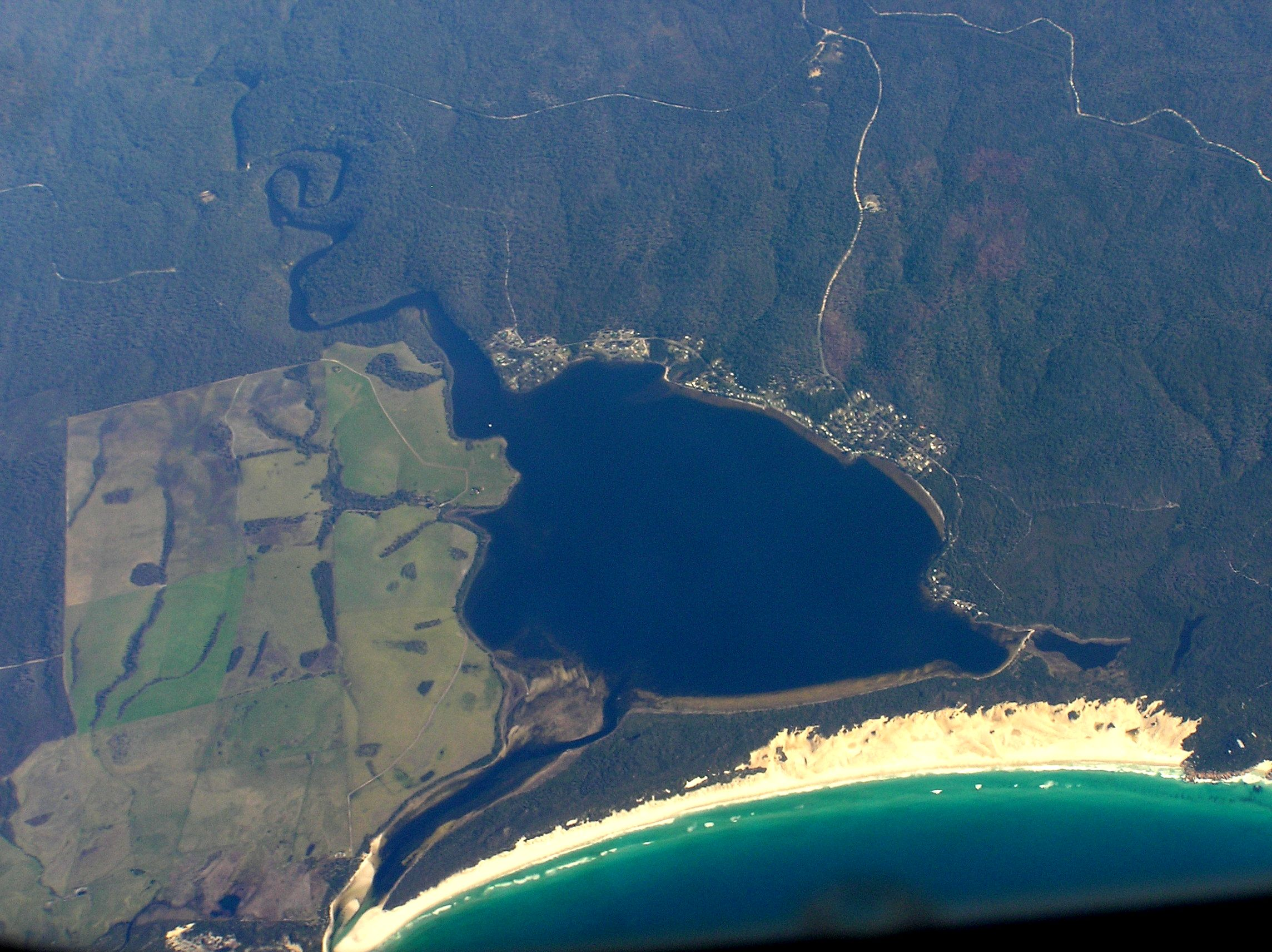
- Aerial photo from the east; the village at the top of the bay

- Coordinates: 41°02′08″S 148°16′05″E
- Country: Australia
- State: Tasmania
- Region: North-east
- LGA: Break O'Day Council
- Location: 293 km (182 mi) N of Hobart; 161 km (100 mi) E of Launceston; 43 km (27 mi) N of St Helens

Government
  - State electorate: Lyons
  - Federal division: Lyons

Population
  - Total: 62 (2021 census)
- Postcode: 7264
Localities around Ansons Bay
Gladstone	Mount William	Eddystone
Gladstone	Ansons Bay	Tasman Sea
Goulds Country	Goshen	The Gardens

Ansons Bay is a rural locality in the local government area (LGA) of Break O'Day in the North-east LGA region of Tasmania. The locality is about 43 kilometres (27 mi) north of the town of St Helens. The 2021 census recorded a population of 62 for the state suburb of Ansons Bay.

It is both a geographical feature and a small township on the extreme north-east coast of Tasmania. The bay has notable tidal sandflats. For much of the 20th century the timber industry was predominant but it is now mostly involved in fishing and tourism. The Ansons Bay postcode was changed from 7216 to 7264 in 2009 because the mail service is now via Gladstone rather than St Helens.

== History ==
Ansons Bay was gazetted as a locality in 1968. Several origins of the name have been suggested, including William J Anson (the first surgeon in the Derwent settlement) and Admiral George Anson. Another suggestion is that surveyor Charles Gould named the area after an early settler.

Ansons Bay Receiving House (a private post office) opened on 15 December 1913 and closed around 1917.

== Geography ==
The waters of the Bay of Fires, part of the Tasman Sea, form the eastern boundary. Ansons Bay (the body of water) is joined to the ocean by a narrow channel and is almost completely surrounded by the locality.

== Road infrastructure ==
Route C843 (Ansons Bay Road) enters from the south and runs through to the north where it meets North Ansons Road at a T junction, where it turns left and runs north-west until it exits. Route C846 (Eddystone Point Road) starts at an intersection with C843 and runs along part of the northern boundary.
