= Goshen, Tasmania =

Goshen Tasmania
- Coordinates: 41°16′51″S 148°08′30″E
- Population: 93 (2016 census)
- Postcode(s): 7216
- Location: 11 km (7 mi) NW of St Helens
- LGA(s): Break O'Day
- Region: North-east
- State electorate(s): Lyons
- Federal division(s): Lyons
Localities around Goshen:
| Goulds Country | Ansons Bay | The Gardens |
| Pyengana | Goshen | St Helens, The Gardens |
| Mathinna | St Helens, Mathinna | St Helens |

Goshen is a rural locality in the local government area of Break O'Day in the North-east region of Tasmania. It is located about 11 kilometres (6.8 mi) north-west of the town of St Helens. The 2016 census determined a population of 93 for the state suburb of Goshen.

== History ==
The name is a Biblical reference to fertile land. Goshen was gazetted as a locality in 1964.

== Geography ==
The Scamander River forms the south-western boundary.

== Road infrastructure ==
The Tasman Highway (A3) passes through from west to east. Route C841 (Terrys Hill Road) starts at an intersection with A3 on the western boundary and runs north before exiting to the north-west. Route C843 (Ansons Bay Road) passes through the north-east corner from south to north.
