= Lottah =

- Town
- Coordinates: 41°13′15″S 148°01′19″E
- Country: Australia
- State: Tasmania
- Region: North-east
- LGA: Break O'Day Council
- Location: 27 km (17 mi) NW of St Helens

Government
  - State electorate: Lyons
  - Federal division: Lyons

Population
  - Total: 13 (2016 census)
- Postcode: 7216
Localities around Lottah
Weldborough	Goulds Country	Goulds Country
Weldborough	Lottah	Goulds Country
Pyengana	Pyengana	Goulds Country

Lottah is a rural locality in the local government area (LGA) of Break O'Day in the North-east LGA region of Tasmania, Australia. The locality is about 27 kilometres (17 mi) north-west of the town of St Helens. The 2016 census recorded a population of 13 for the state suburb of Lottah. It is a small town in Northeastern Tasmania. The closest settlement is Pyengana and the closest major town is St Helens.

== History ==
Lottah was gazetted as a locality in 1969. It was historically known as Blue Tier Junction. A post office of that name was established in 1877 and renamed "Lottah" in 1895, supposedly an Aboriginal word for "gum tree".

Tin was discovered in Lottah in about 1875. The Anchor Mine became operational in 1880, and the town of Lottah grew up around the mine. At its peak, it had several hundred residents, and community facilities included a school, two hotels, two churches, a bakery, and a football club. Lottah supported a small Chinese community, and one of its more notable residents was Senator Thomas Bakhap, who had a Chinese stepfather and worked as an interpreter. People born in Lottah during its heyday include architecture professor Brian Lewis and RAAF officer Alan Charlesworth. The Anchor Mine closed in 1950, at which point the town's population had been in decline for several decades.

== Geography ==
Almost all the boundaries are survey lines.

== Road infrastructure ==
Route A3 (Tasman Highway) passes to the south. From there, several roads provide access to the locality.
