= Hibbertia hirticalyx =

Scientific classification
- Kingdom: Plantae
- Clade: Tracheophytes
- Clade: Angiosperms
- Clade: Eudicots
- Order: Dilleniales
- Family: Dilleniaceae
- Genus: Hibbertia
- Species: H. hirticalyx

Binomial name
- Hibbertia hirticalyx Toelken

Species of plant

Hibbertia hirticalyx is a species of flowering plant in the family Dilleniaceae and is endemic to south-eastern Australia. It is an erect, spreading or low-lying shrub with hairy foliage, elliptic leaves, and yellow flowers with eight to twelve stamens arranged in a cluster on one side of the two carpels.

== Description ==
Hibbertia hirticalyx is an erect, spreading or low-lying shrub that typically grows to a height of 0.3–1.0 m (1 ft 0 in – 3 ft 3 in) and has hairy foliage. The leaves are narrow elliptic to narrow lance-shaped with the narrower end towards the base, 8–17 mm (0.31–0.67 in) long and 2–8 mm (0.079–0.315 in) wide on a petiole 0.4–1.4 mm (0.016–0.055 in) long. The edges of the leaves are turned down or rolled under. The flowers are arranged singly on the ends of the branchlets on a peduncle 2–8 mm (0.079–0.315 in) long, with a linear bract 3.0–4.4 mm (0.12–0.17 in) long. The five sepals are joined at the base, 3.2–6.2 mm (0.13–0.24 in) long and covered with star-shaped hairs. The five petals are bright yellow and wedge-shaped with a notch on the end, 6.0–9.6 mm (0.24–0.38 in) long. There are eight to twelve stamens arranged in a single cluster on one side of the two carpels, each carpel with four ovules.

== Taxonomy ==
Hibbertia hirticalyx was first formally described in 1998 by Hellmut R. Toelken in the Journal of the Adelaide Botanic Gardens from specimens collected near Gladstone in Tasmania, in 1983. The specific epithet (hirticalyx) means "sepals with long, soft hairs".

== Distribution and habitat ==
This hibbertia grows in open forest in dry areas on Wilson's Promontory in Victoria, in the north of Tasmania and on the Bass Strait Islands.

== See also ==
- List of Hibbertia species
