= Mount William =

Mount William may refer to:

- Mount William (Antarctica)
- Mount William (Mount Duwil), in the Grampians National Park, Victoria, Australia
- Mount William (Queensland), the summit of the Clarke Range in North Queensland, Australia
- Mount William stone axe quarry, near Lancefield, Victoria, Australia
- Mount William National Park, Tasmania, Australia
- Mount William, Tasmania, a locality in Australia
- Mount William, a sub-hill in the Battle of Mount Tumbledown of the Falklands War
