= The Gardens, Tasmania =

The Gardens Tasmania
- Coordinates: 41°10′36″S 148°16′30″E
- Population: 19 (2016 census)
- Postcode(s): 7216
- Location: 19 km (12 mi) N of St Helens
- LGA(s): Break O'Day
- Region: North-east
- State electorate(s): Lyons
- Federal division(s): Lyons
Localities around The Gardens:
Ansons Bay	Ansons Bay	Tasman Sea
Ansons Bay	The Gardens	Tasman Sea
St Helens, Goshen	Binalong Bay	Tasman Sea

The Gardens is a rural locality in the local government area of Break O'Day in the North-east region of Tasmania. It is located about 19 kilometres (12 mi) north of the town of St Helens. The 2016 census determined a population of 19 for the state suburb of The Gardens.

== History ==
The Gardens was gazetted as a locality in 1961.

== Geography ==
The Tasman Sea forms the eastern boundary.

== Road infrastructure ==
The C848 route (Gardens Road) enters from the south-east and ends at the village.
