= Thomas Bakhap =

Australian politician

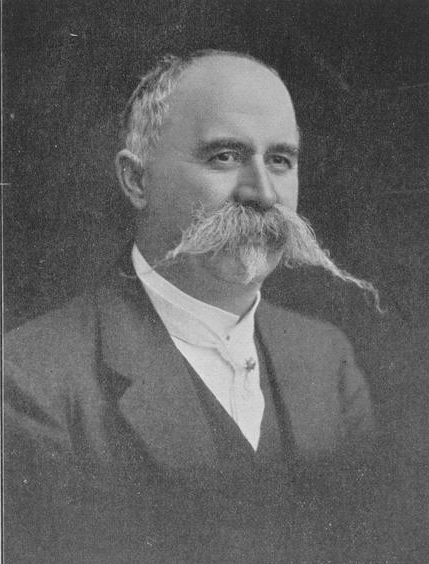

Senator for Tasmania
- In office 1 July 1913 – 18 August 1923
- Succeeded by: John Hayes

Personal details
- Born: 29 October 1866 Ballaarat, Victoria
- Died: 18 August 1923 (aged 56) Launceston, Tasmania, Australia
- Party: Liberal (1913–17); Nationalist (1917–23)
- Occupation: Politician

Thomas Jerome Kingston Bakhap (29 October 1866 – 18 August 1923) was an Australian politician. He was born in Ballarat, Victoria, the adoptive son of a Chinese immigrant, Bak Hap. He received no formal education but became a shopworker, and was later a tin miner at Lottah, Tasmania. In 1909, he was elected to the Tasmanian House of Assembly for Bass. In 1913, he transferred to federal politics, winning a Tasmanian Senate seat as a member of the Commonwealth Liberal Party. He was Chairman of Committees from July 1920 to June 1923. Bakhap died in August 1923; John Hayes was appointed to replace him. Bakhap was fluent in Cantonese. He advocated for the Chinese community when Chinese Australians encountered problems arising from the application of the White Australia Policy. He visited China in 1922 as a representative of the Australian government, and by that time was recognised as the parliament's pre-eminent expert in Chinese and South-East Asian affairs.
