= Weldborough, Tasmania =

Weldborough
- Town
- Coordinates: 41°11′54″S 147°54′13″E
- Country: Australia
- State: Tasmania
- Region: North-east
- LGA: Break O'Day, Dorset
- Location: 44 km (27 mi) NW of St Helens

Government
  - State electorate: Lyons, Bass
  - Federal division: Lyons, Bass

Population
  - Total: 33 (SAL 2021)
- Postcode: 7264
Localities around Weldborough
Derby	Moorina	Gladstone
Derby, Ringarooma	Weldborough	Lottah
Pyengana	Pyengana	Pyengana

Weldborough is a rural locality in the local government areas of Break O'Day and Dorset in the North-east region of Tasmania. It is located about 44 kilometres (27 mi) north-west of the town of St Helens.

== History ==
The area was named for Sir Frederick Weld, Governor of Tasmania from 1875 to 1880. Weldborough was gazetted as a locality in 1969.

Weldborough was a tin mining village, which by the 1880s was populated largely by Chinese miners who had come across from Victoria.

There must be fully 300 men congregated within the camp, all living in the highest state of enjoyment, for the time being all things seem to be held in common, even the barbarous European is present again and again to partake of their dainties, consisting of pork, fowls, and rice, with oceans of oil and other celestial condiments.

Intermarriage was common and reference was made to

... the large brood of almond eyed, olive-cheeked urchins attending our day school

Weldborough had a Joss House that remained until the 1930s and some of its artifacts are now in the Queen Victoria Museum and Art Gallery.

== Demography ==
The 2016 census determined a population of 28 for the state suburb of Weldborough. At the 2021 census, the population had increased to 33.

== Geography ==
The North George River forms part of the southern boundary.

== Road infrastructure ==
The Tasman Highway (A3) enters from the north-west and runs south-east through the village before exiting to the south-east. Route C425 (Blundell Street / Mount Paris Dam Road) starts at an intersection with A3 and runs west and south-west before exiting.
