= Mount Victoria (Tasmania) =

Mountain in Tasmania, Australia

- Location within Tasmania

Highest point
- Elevation: 1,213 m (3,980 ft)AHD
- Prominence: 433 m (1,421 ft)
- Parent peak: Legges Tor
- Isolation: 9.96 km (6.19 mi)
- Listing: List of highest mountains of Tasmania
- Coordinates: 41°19′48″S 147°49′48″E

Geography
- Location: Tasmania, Australia
- Parent range: Ben Lomond

Geology
- Rock age: Jurassic
- Mountain type: Dolerite

Mount Victoria is a mountain in the Mount Victoria Forest Reserve in north-east Tasmania, Australia, and also forms part of the Ben Lomond bioregion and the Ben Lomond National Park. The peak has an elevation of 1,213 metres (3,980 ft) above sea level and is the 58th highest mountain in Tasmania. It is a prominent feature of the reserve, and is a popular venue with bushwalkers.

Mount Victoria Forest Reserve has a picnic area, barbeque facilities and toilets. Ralphs Falls can be accessed from the Reserve. Ralphs Falls is one of Tasmania's highest waterfalls and Tasmania's highest single drop waterfall. It has a drop of 90 metres (300 ft) over a sheer cliff face.

== See also ==
- List of highest mountains of Tasmania
