= Binalong Bay =

- Town
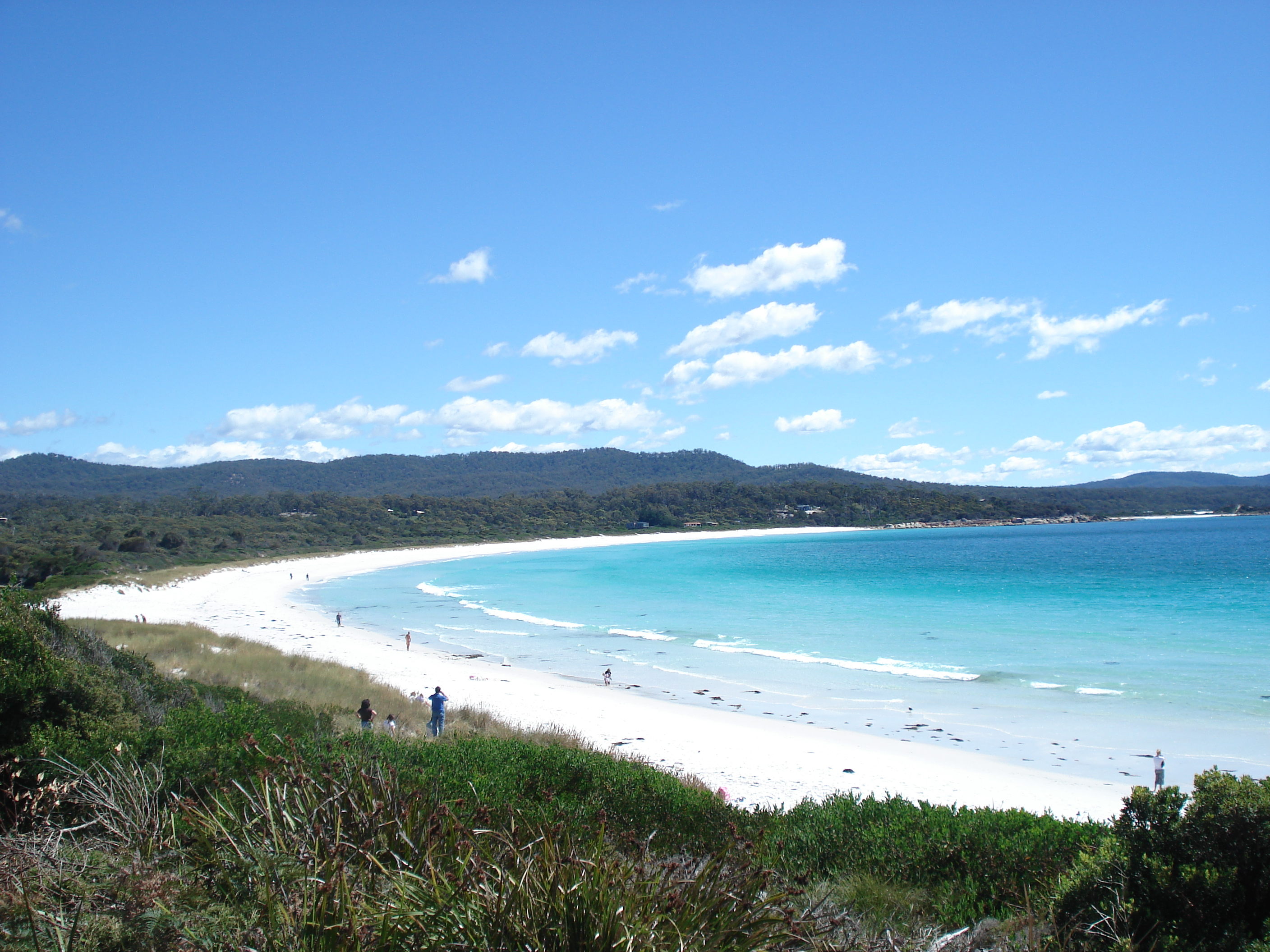
- Binalong Bay Beach

- Coordinates: 41°15′S 148°18′E
- Country: Australia
- State: Tasmania
- Region: North-east
- LGA: Break O'Day Council
- Location: 12 km (7.5 mi) NE of St Helens

Government
  - State electorate: Lyons
  - Federal division: Lyons

Population
  - Total: 290 (2016 census)
- Postcode: 7216
Localities around Binalong Bay
The Gardens	The Gardens	Tasman Sea
St Helens	Binalong Bay	Tasman Sea
St Helens	St Helens	Georges Bay

Binalong Bay is a rural locality in the local government area (LGA) of Break O'Day in the North-east LGA region of Tasmania. The locality is about 12 kilometres (7.5 mi) north-east of the town of St Helens. The 2016 census recorded a population of 290 for the state suburb of Binalong Bay.

It is a small coastal town in north-east Tasmania, situated at the southern end of the Bay of Fires. Originally a fishing hamlet, the town is now a village with a large proportion of holiday dwellings. It has a beach, small harbour (known as the gulch) and a cafe.

== History ==
Binalong Bay was gazetted as a locality in 1964. Originally known as Boat Harbour, the current name was adopted in 1944. It is believed to be the Aboriginal name.

Binalong Bay Post Office opened on 30 March 1966 and closed in 1973.

== Geography ==
The waters of the Bay of Fires, part of the Tasman Sea, form part of the eastern boundary. The Tasman Sea and the waters of Georges Bay complete the eastern boundary and form part of the southern. Grants Lagoon, an inlet of Binalong Bay (the body of water) is surrounded by the locality.

== Road infrastructure ==
Route C850 (Binalong Bay Road) enters from the south-west and runs through to the east, where it ends. Route C848 (Gardens Road) starts at an intersection with C850 and runs north until it exits. Route C849 (Reids Road) starts at an intersection with C848 and runs west until it exits.

== Gallery ==
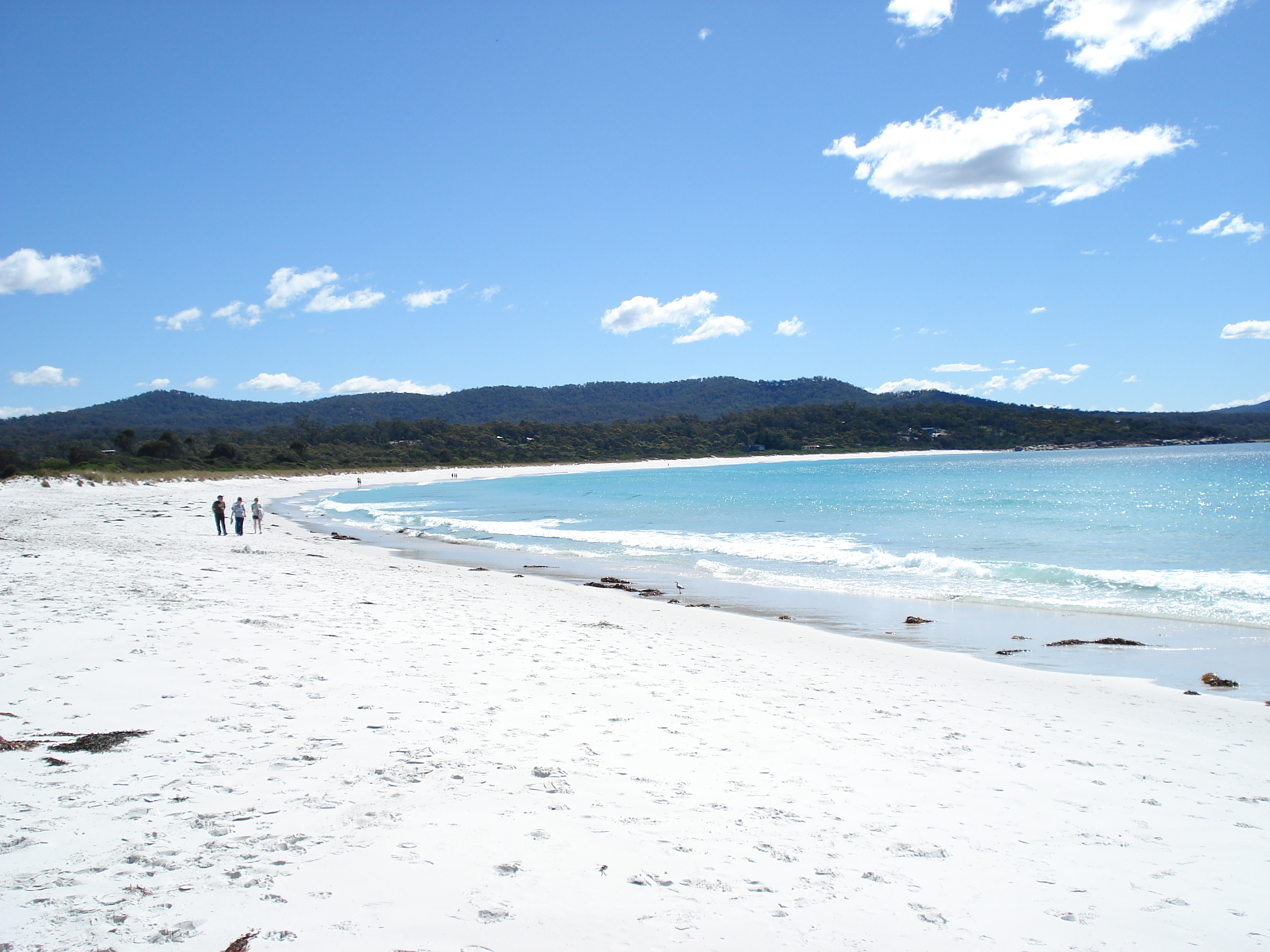
Binalong Bay Beach

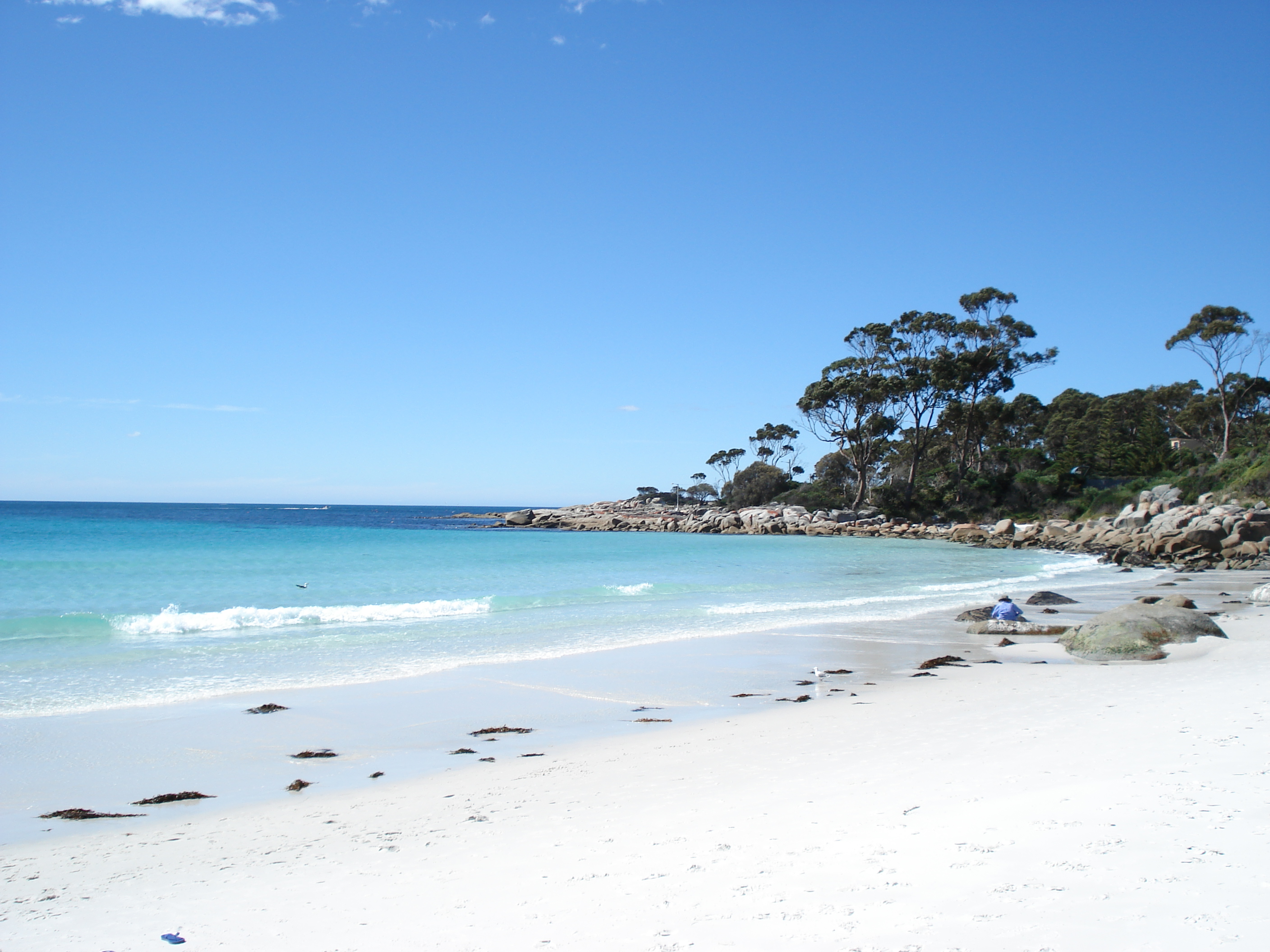
Beach and rocks
