= Gladstone, Tasmania =

Gladstone
- Town
- Coordinates: 40°58′54″S 148°00′34″E
- Country: Australia
- State: Tasmania
- Region: North-east
- LGA: Break O'Day, Dorset
- Location: 50 km (31 mi) N of St Helens

Government
  - State electorate: Lyons, Bass
  - Federal division: Lyons, Bass

Population
  - Total: 139 (2016 census)
- Postcode: 7264
Localities around Gladstone
Boobyalla	Rushy Lagoon, Musselroe Bay	Mount William
Pioneer, South Mount Cameron	Gladstone	Ansons Bay
Weldborough	Goulds Country, Weldborough	Ansons Bay

Gladstone is a rural locality in the local government areas of Break O'Day and Dorset in the North-east region of Tasmania. It is located about 50 kilometres (31 mi) north of the town of St Helens. The 2016 census determined a population of 139 for the state suburb of Gladstone.

== History ==
It was originally known as Mount Cameron; the name Gladstone was in use by 1882. The area was named for William Ewart Gladstone, Prime Minister of Great Britain. Gladstone was gazetted as a locality in 1968.

== Geography ==
The Ringarooma River enters the locality from the west and flows through to the north-west.

== Road infrastructure ==
The B82 route (Waterhouse Road / Gladstone Road) enters from the north-west and runs south-east to the village before exiting to the south-west. Route C843 (Carr Street / Cape Portland Road / North Ansons Road) starts at an intersection with B82 and runs east and south-east before exiting. Route C844 (a continuation of Cape Portland Road) starts at an intersection with C843 and exits to the north. Route C845 starts at an intersection with C843 and exits to the north-east.
