= Mount Victoria Forest Reserve =

Protected area in Tasmania, Australia

- Location within Tasmania
- Location: Tasmania
- Nearest city: Launceston
- Coordinates: 41°33′03″S 147°40′01″E
- Established: 1997
- Governing body: Tasmania Parks and Wildlife Service

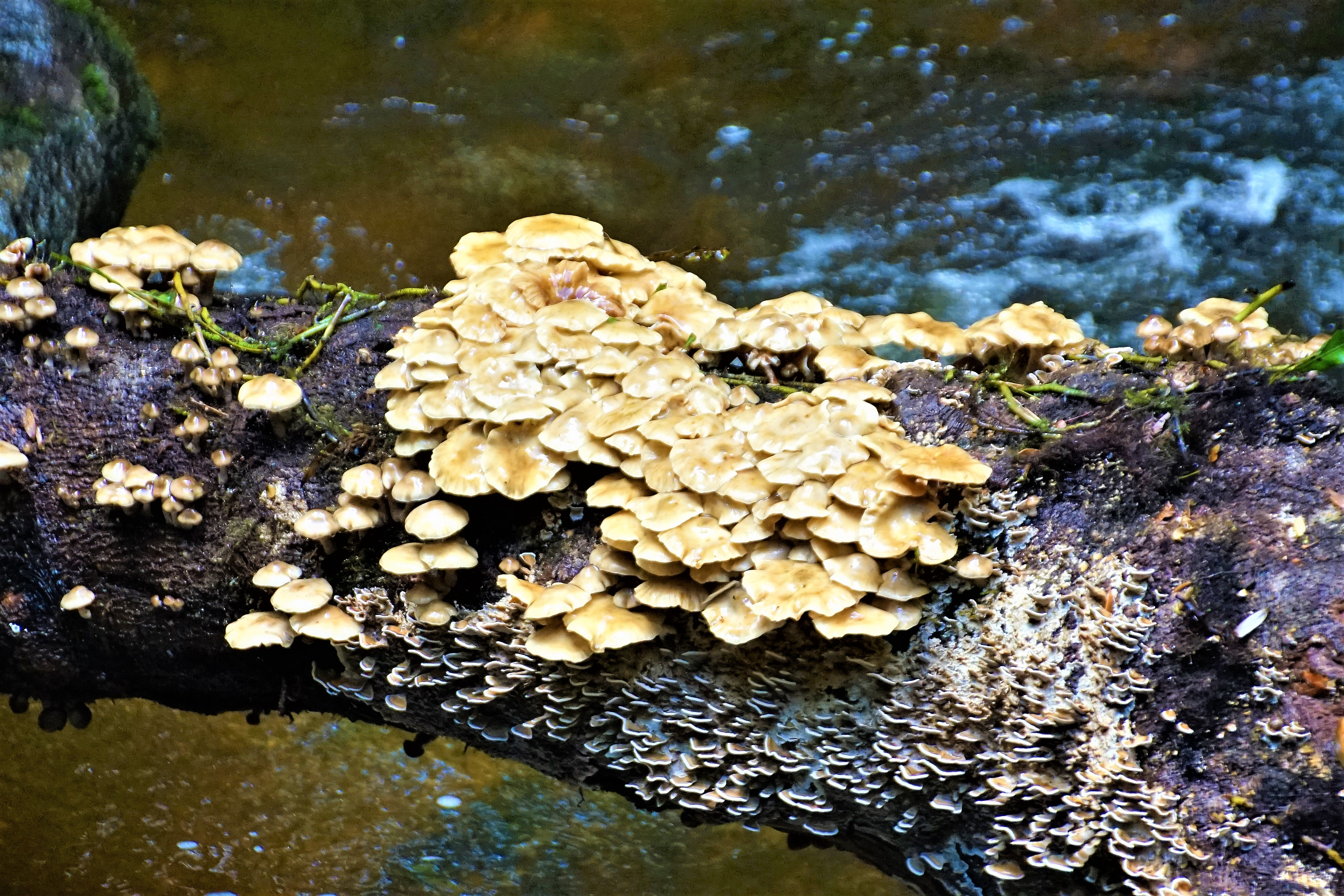
Fungi at St Columba Falls - Mount Victoria Forest Reserve

Mount Victoria Reserve is a temperate rainforest area in the North East portion of the Australian state of Tasmania. It is of acknowledged conservation significance and was identified as a high priority Recommended Area for Protection (RAP) by authorities during the 1980s and protected as part of the Comprehensive and Representative (CAR) Reserve system touted by Tasmanian State and Federal Australian Governments as securing conservation values.

In fact, Mount Victoria was an integral part of a proposal commissioned by a group of concerned residents of Tasmania's North East entitled 'A new National Park for Tasmania's Northeast Highlands'. It was presented by the Tasmanian Conservation Trust to the Tasmanian Resource, Planning and Development Commission (RPDC) for its Inquiry into aspects of State's Regional Forest Agreement (RFA) in 1996-1997 during the submission period for the RFA.

Mount Victoria is part of the Ben Lomond bioregion. The proposal was dismissed. Tasmania, under the RFA was treated as one region rather than the eight distinct bioregions that were identified. Alarmingly a recent annual report on Forest Practices stated that the Ben Lomond bioregion has already been cleared to levels below the minimum set out in the May 2005 Howard/Lennon 'community forest agreement' (The latter is supplementary to the RFA and instituted as a result of widespread discontent with the original RFA).

However, in early May 2007 Forestry Tasmania (a Tasmanian Government business enterprise) is considering the construction of a 2.5 kilometre logging access road to facilitate an easier access for Gunns Ltd's adjacent logging coupe. The Tasmanian Greens Opposition Leader said on 7 May 2007: ""Private Timber Reserves such as those to be logged should not be approved if a cartage route is not determined as part of the proposal, or else local government planning and other land uses will be at risk, as on this occasion".

== Waterfalls ==
Mt Victoria Forest Reserve and the surrounding area are home to a couple of beautiful waterfalls.

=== Ralphs Falls ===
Ralphs Falls is a tall 90-metre-high (300 ft) waterfall in the Mt Victoria Forest Reserve, Tasmania. The falls are viewable from a lookout directly opposite them, and are impressive all year round, especially in the winter and spring months. Ralphs Falls are quite close to St Columba Falls, being a 12-kilometre drive away.

=== St Columba Falls ===
St Columba Falls are quite close to Ralphs Falls, although they are technically outside the park boundaries. St Columba Falls are one of the tallest waterfalls in Tasmania, with a height of approximately 90 metres. The falls always have a good flow of water, and are a 25-minute drive out of St Helens. There is a short track, which takes 20 minutes return, that leads to the base of the falls, but it can also be seen from the car park across the gorge.

== See also ==
- Protected areas of Tasmania
