= Bay of Fires =

Bay in Tasmania, Australia

Coordinates: 41.137°S 148.308°E

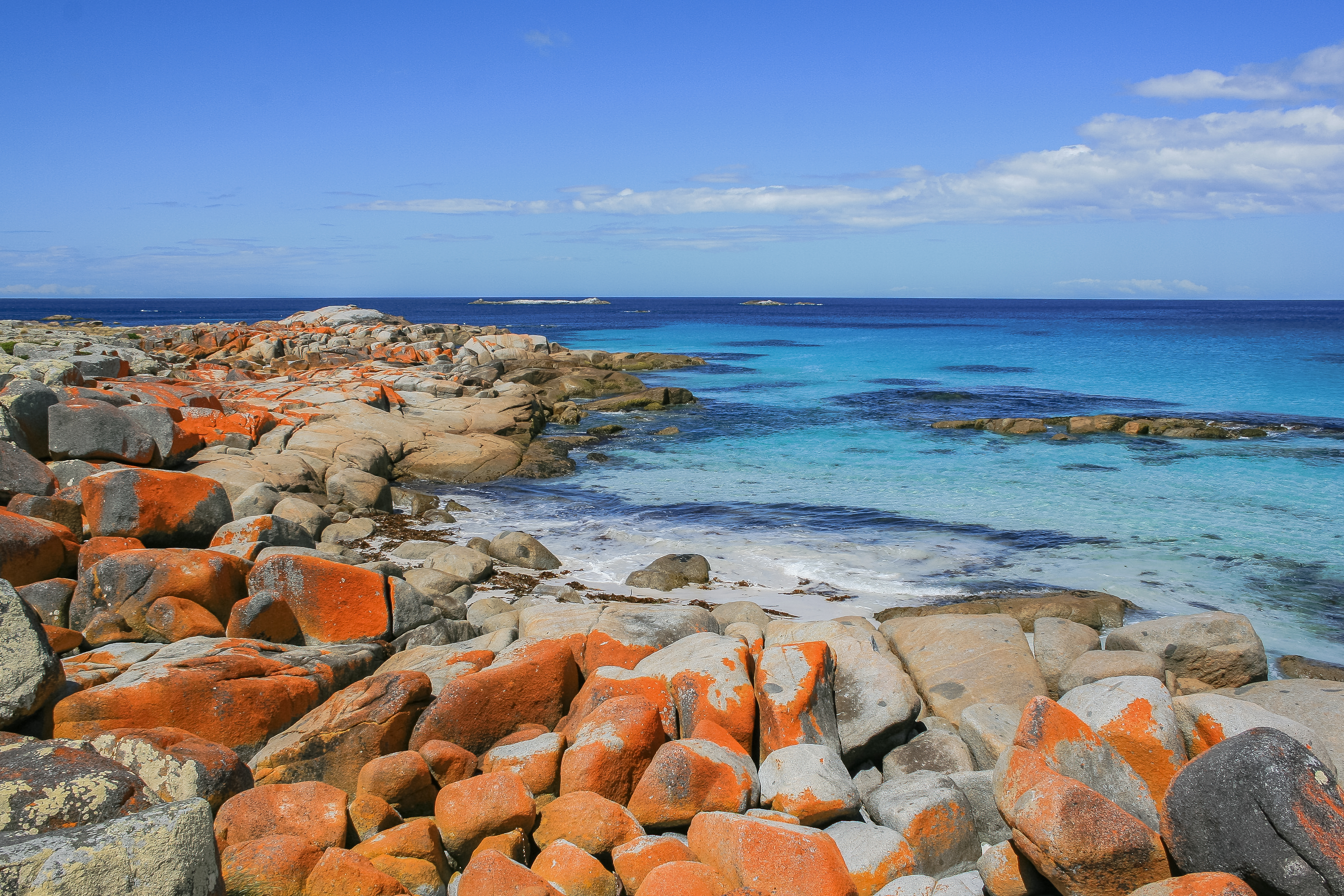
Orange-hued granite rocks in Bay of Fires

The Bay of Fires (palawa kani: larapuna) is a bay on the northeastern coast of Tasmania in Australia, extending from Binalong Bay to Eddystone Point. The bay was given its name in 1773 by Captain Tobias Furneaux in Adventure, who saw the fires of Aboriginal people on the beaches.

Bay whaling activities were carried out in the area in the 1840s.

The Bay of Fires is a region of white beaches, blue water and orange-hued granite (the colour of which is actually produced by a lichen). The northern section of the bay is part of Mount William National Park; the southern end is a conservation area.

A wide range of activities can be pursued in the Bay of Fires area, including camping, beach activities, boating, bird watching, fishing, swimming, surfing and walking.

== Tourism ==
In the 2000s, the Bay of Fires received several tourism accolades. In 2005, it was named as the world's second best beach by Condé Nast. In 2008, it was named the world's "hottest" travel destination for 2009 by international guide book Lonely Planet.

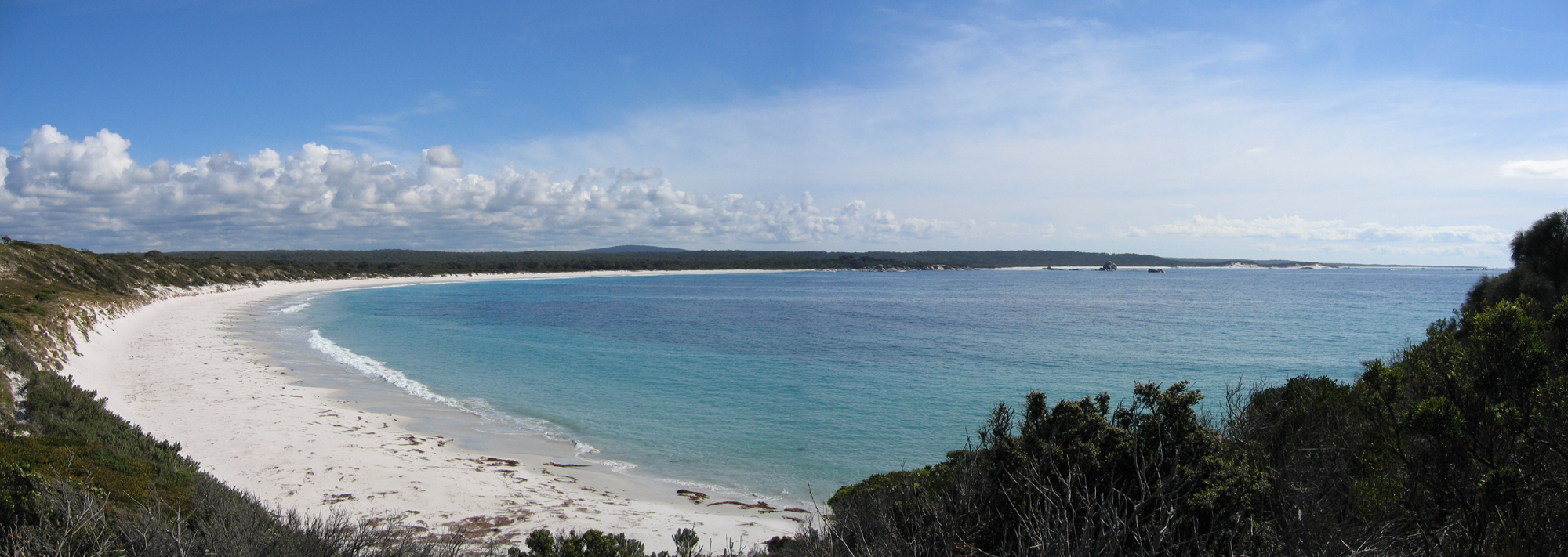
Panorama of Bay of Fires

== History ==
The Bay of Fires was a meeting place for Aboriginal family groups such as Panpe-kanner, Leener-rerter and Pinter-rairer.

== Pictures ==
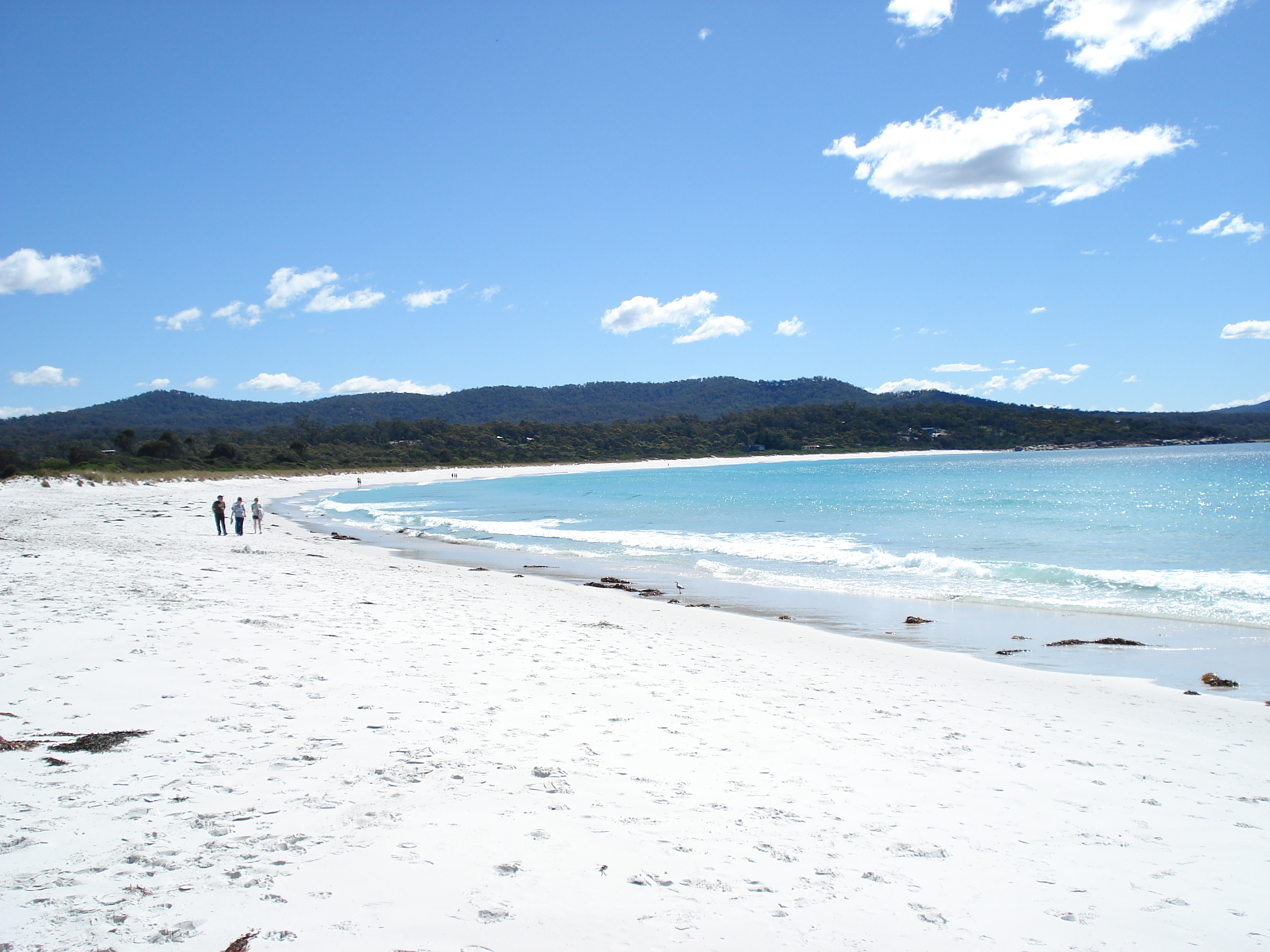
Binalong Bay Beach

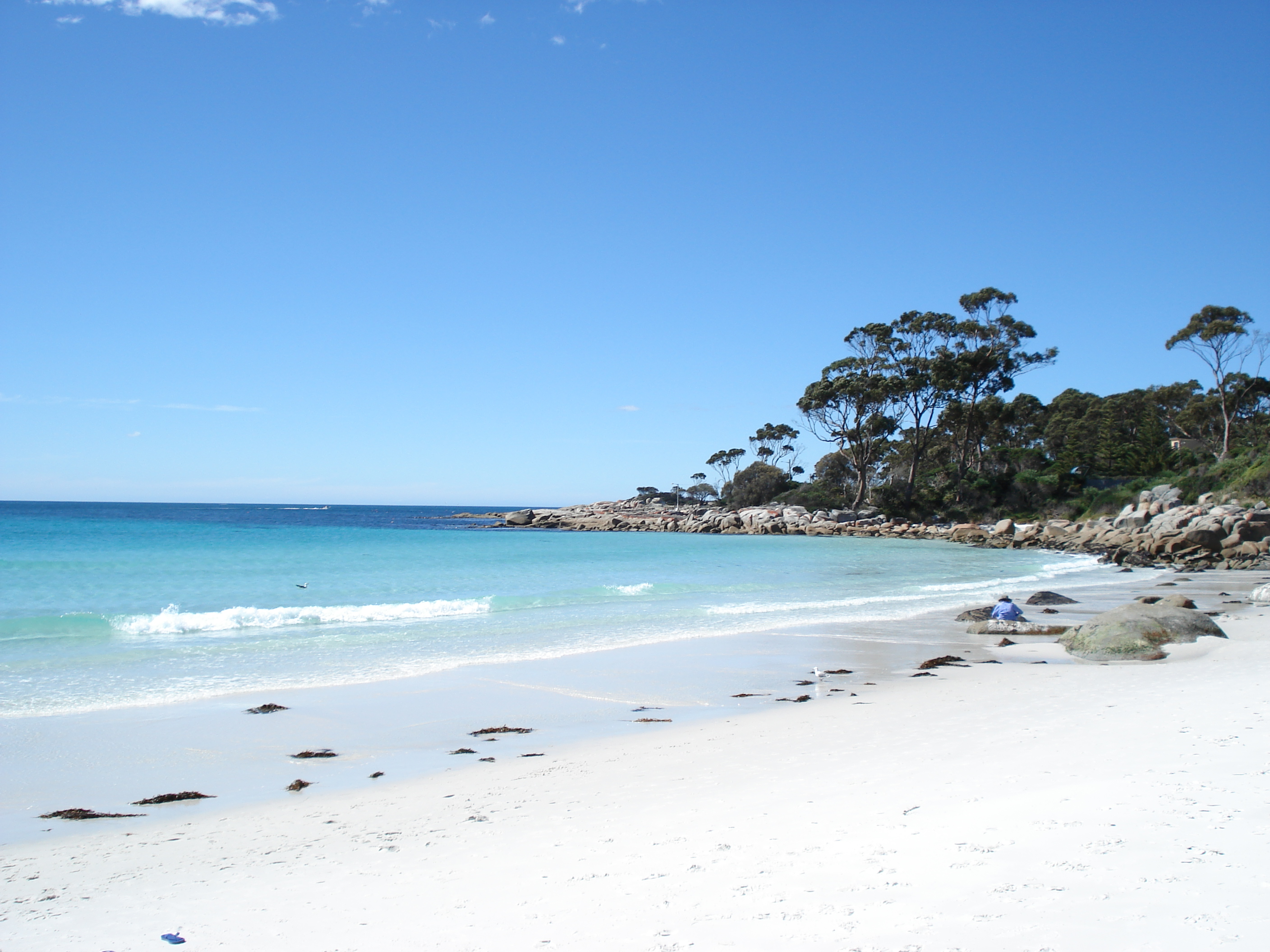
Beach and rocks

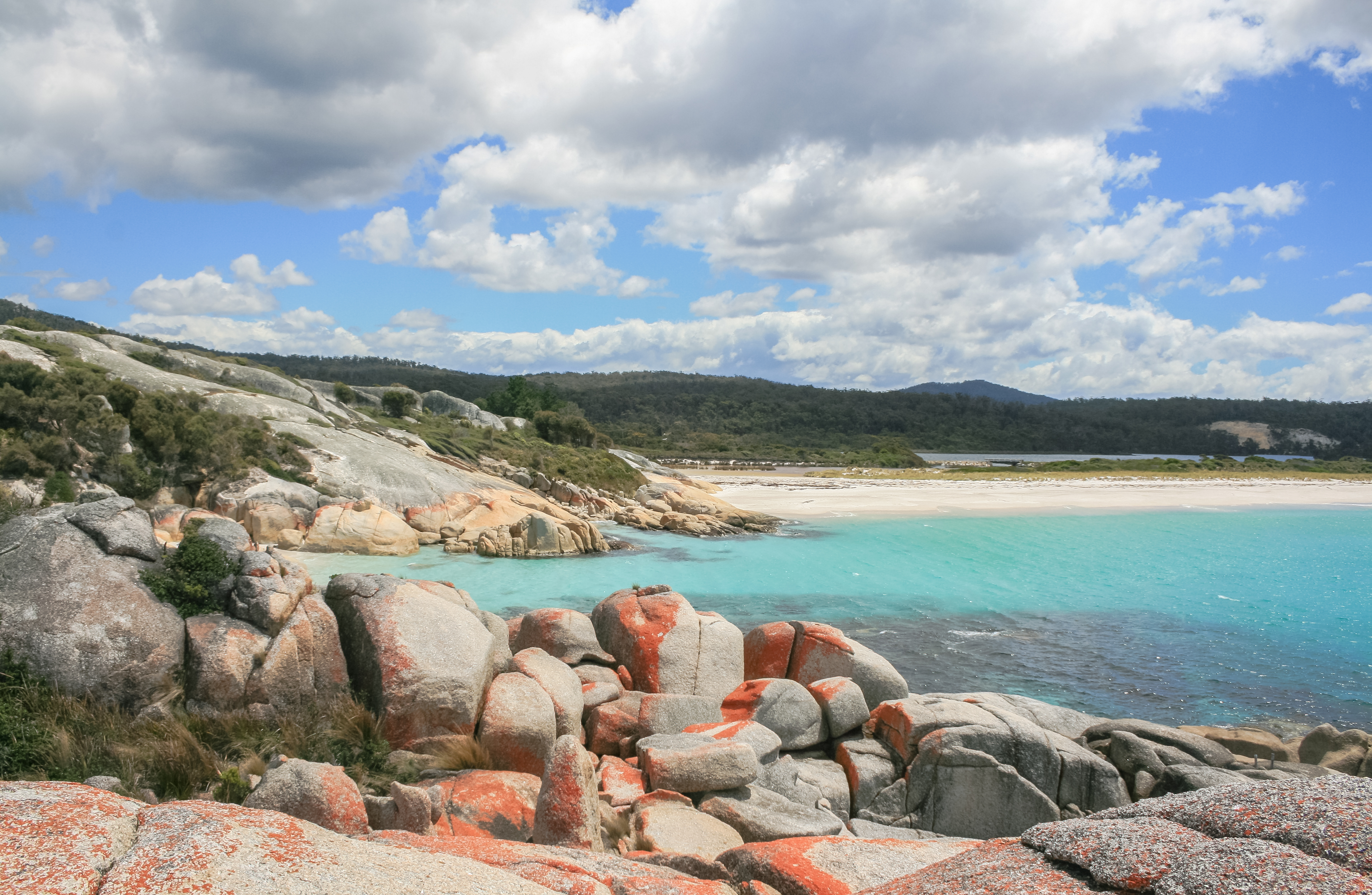

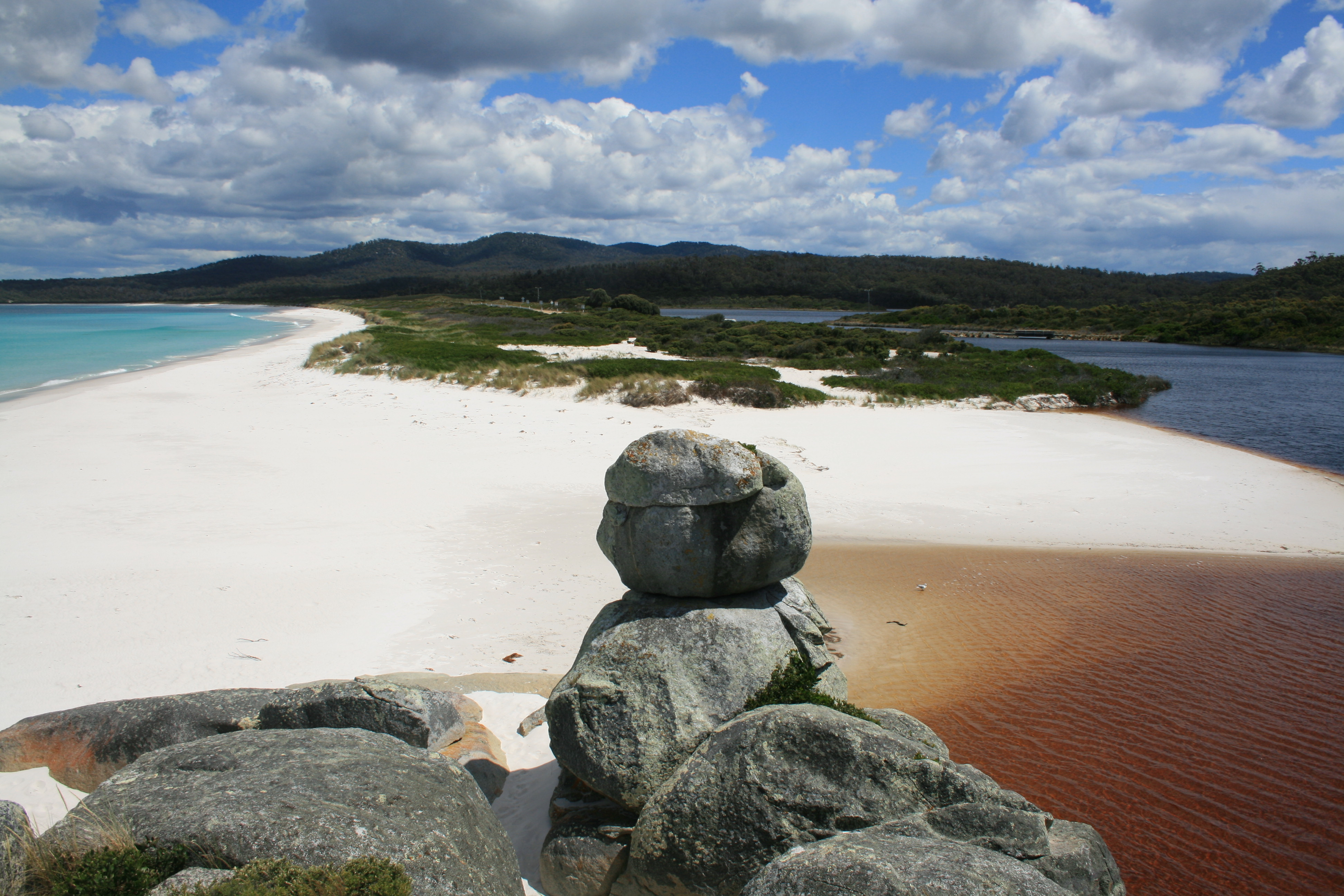

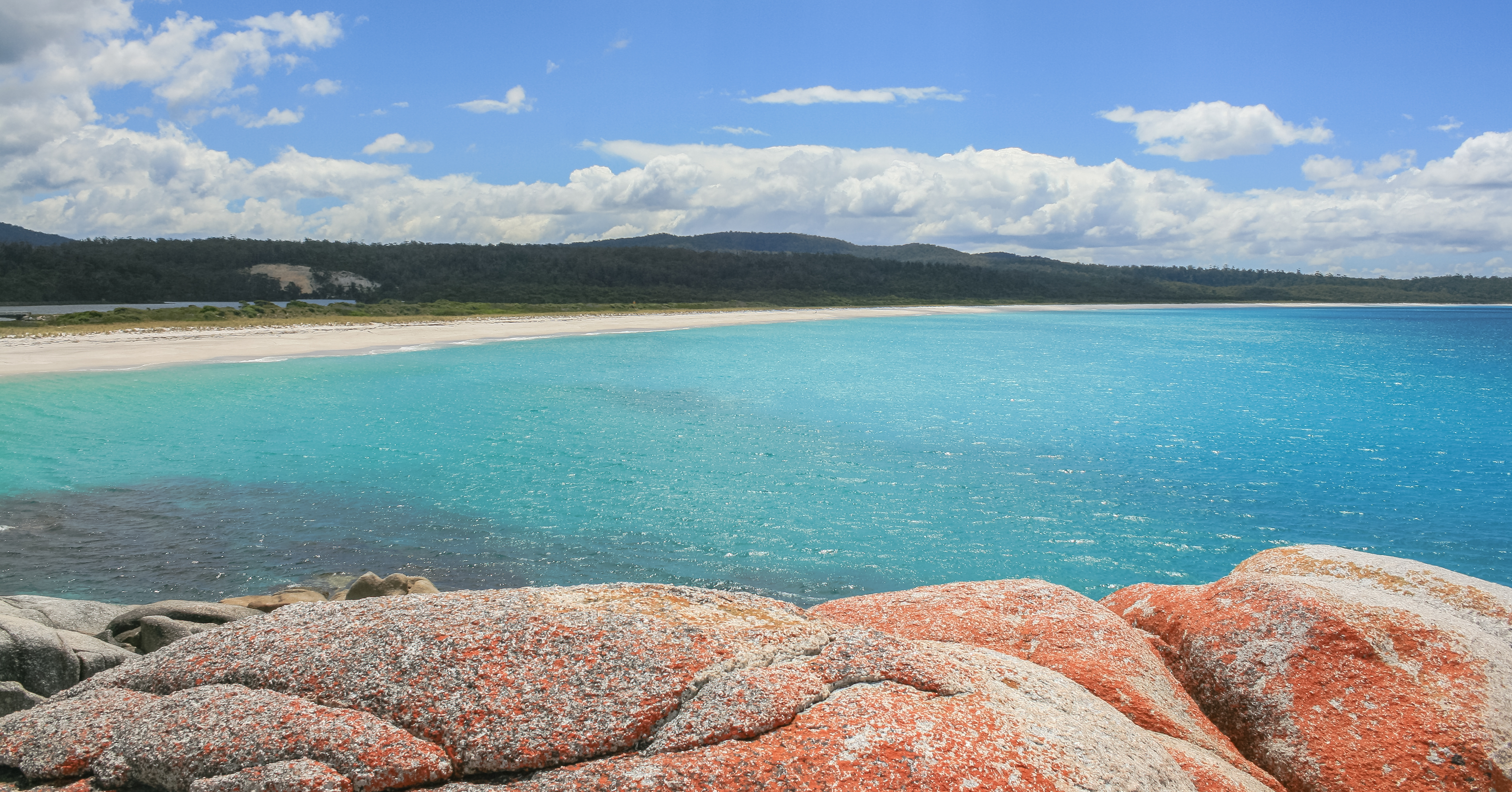
