= Mount William National Park =

National park in Australia

- IUCN category II (national park)
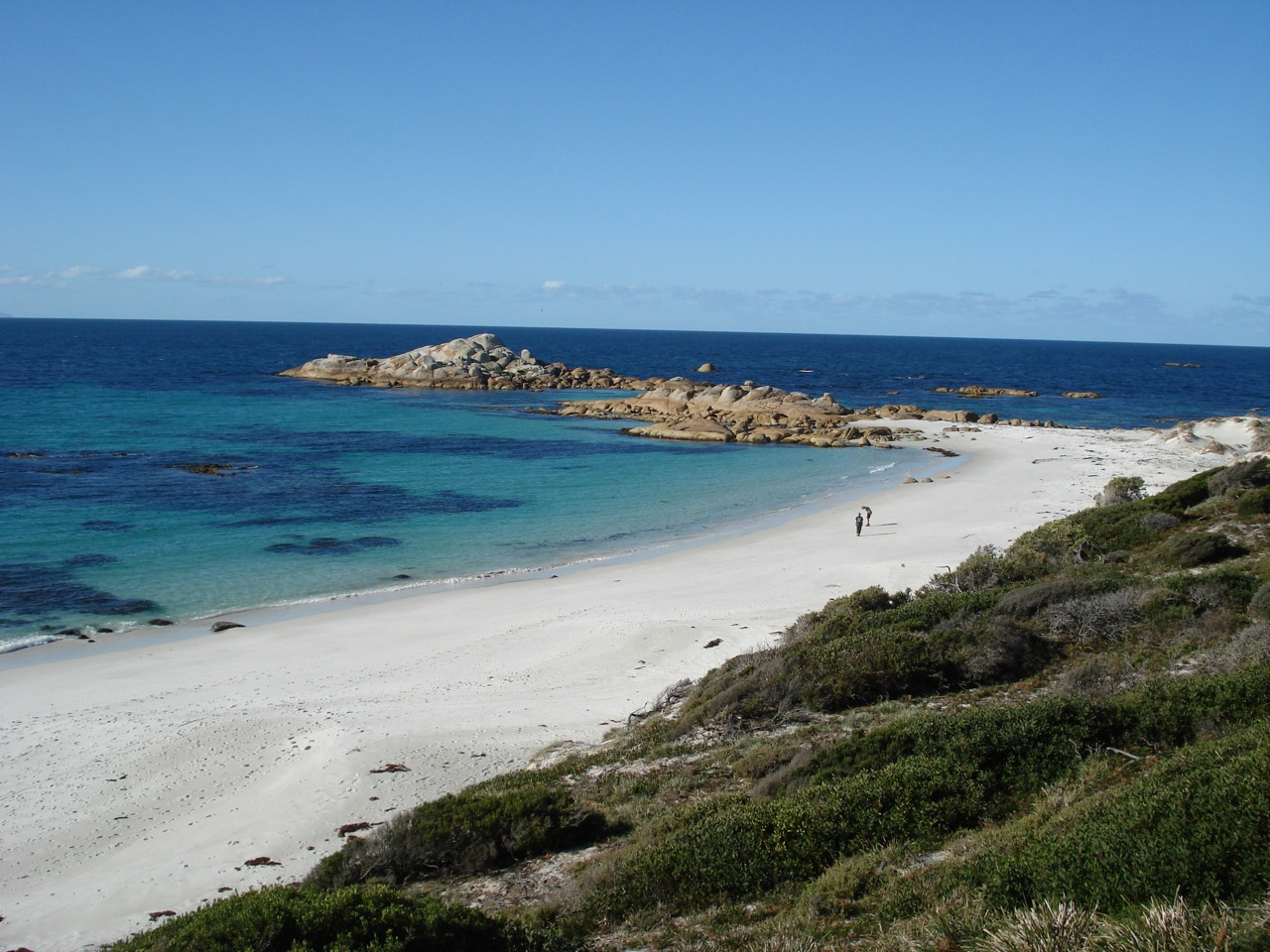
- Stumpys Bay Beach

- Location within Tasmania
- Interactive map of Mount William National Park
- Location: Tasmania
- Nearest city: Scottsdale
- Coordinates: 40°56′16″S 148°15′13″E
- Area: 184.39 km^{2} (71.19 sq mi)
- Established: 1973
- Governing body: Tasmania Parks and Wildlife Service
- Website: Official website

Mount William is a national park, mountain, and locality in Tasmania (Australia), 234 km northeast of Hobart. Established in 1973 as an 8,640 hectares large national park, it has been expanded multiple times, reaching 13,806 ha in 1980 and 18,439 ha in 1999. The park is named after a hill that is 216m above sea level. In 2016, the official name of the mountain (but not the park) was changed to wukalina / Mount William.

== Flora and fauna ==
The park provides protected habitat to eastern grey kangaroos, wombats, Bennetts wallabies, Tasmanian pademelons, echidnas, brush-tailed possums and Tasmanian devils.

== See also ==
- Protected areas of Tasmania
- Mount William National Park travel guide from Wikivoyage
