= St Helens, Tasmania =

St Helens
- Town
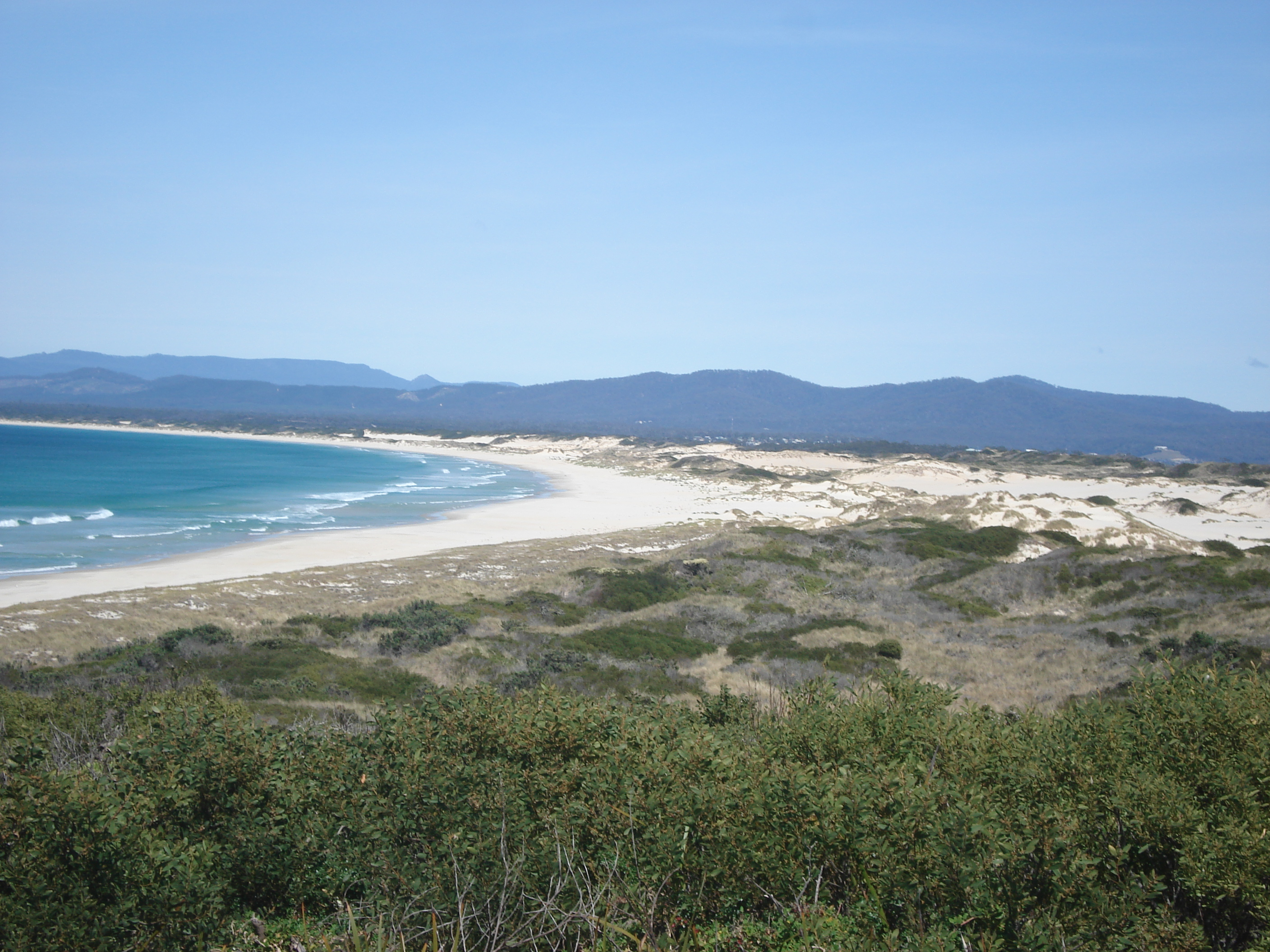

- Coordinates: 41°19′0″S 148°14′0″E
- Country: Australia
- State: Tasmania
- LGA: Break O'Day Council
- Location: 18 km (11 mi) from Scamander; 36 km (22 mi) from St Marys; 89 km (55 mi) from Scottsdale; 148 km (92 mi) from Launceston

Government
  - State electorate: Lyons
  - Federal division: Lyons

Population
  - Total: 2,206 (2021 census)
- Postcode: 7216
- Mean max temp: 18.1 °C (64.6 °F)
- Mean min temp: 9.0 °C (48.2 °F)
- Annual rainfall: 717.9 mm (28.26 in)
Localities around St Helens
	Binalong Bay
St Helens	Stieglitz

St Helens is the largest town on the north-east coast of Tasmania, Australia, on Georges Bay. It is known as the game fishing capital of Tasmania and is also renowned for its oysters (as are some other areas of Tasmania). It is located on the Tasman Highway, about 160 km east of Tasmania's second largest city, Launceston. In the early 2000s, the town was one of the fastest growing areas of Tasmania, and reached a population of 2049 at the 2006 census. By the time of the 2021 census, it had a population of 2,206.

St Helens is part of the Break O'Day Council, a council that includes the nearby town of Binalong Bay. St Helens also has its own radio station named Star FM Tasmania a community station on 93.7 MHz in the town, 100.3 MHz in St Marys and 98.5 MHz in Bicheno. A number of shops can be found in the town along Cecilia Street, such as the Bay of Fires IGA. and Gallery Parnella.

== History ==
St Helens was first used as a whaling base in the early 19th century. When tin was discovered in the surrounding area in the 1870s, St Helens became the shipping port for the mines. This was the first time a coach service had been introduced to the town; previous access had only been by sea. The town was named after St Helens, Isle of Wight. Today the town is a popular resort for fishing, swimming and other aquatic activities. Its economy is based largely on tourism, fishing and timber.

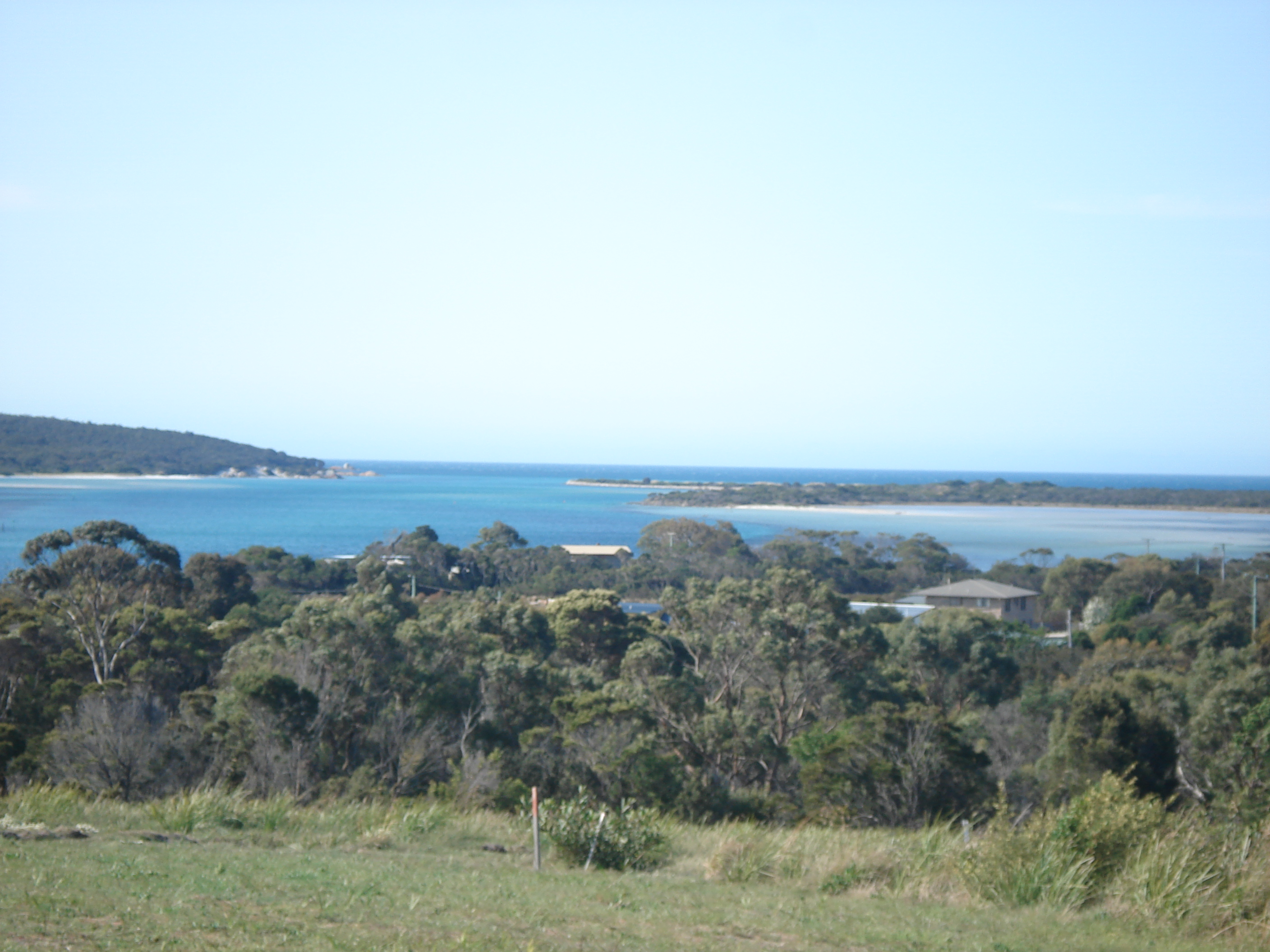
George's Bay and Barway

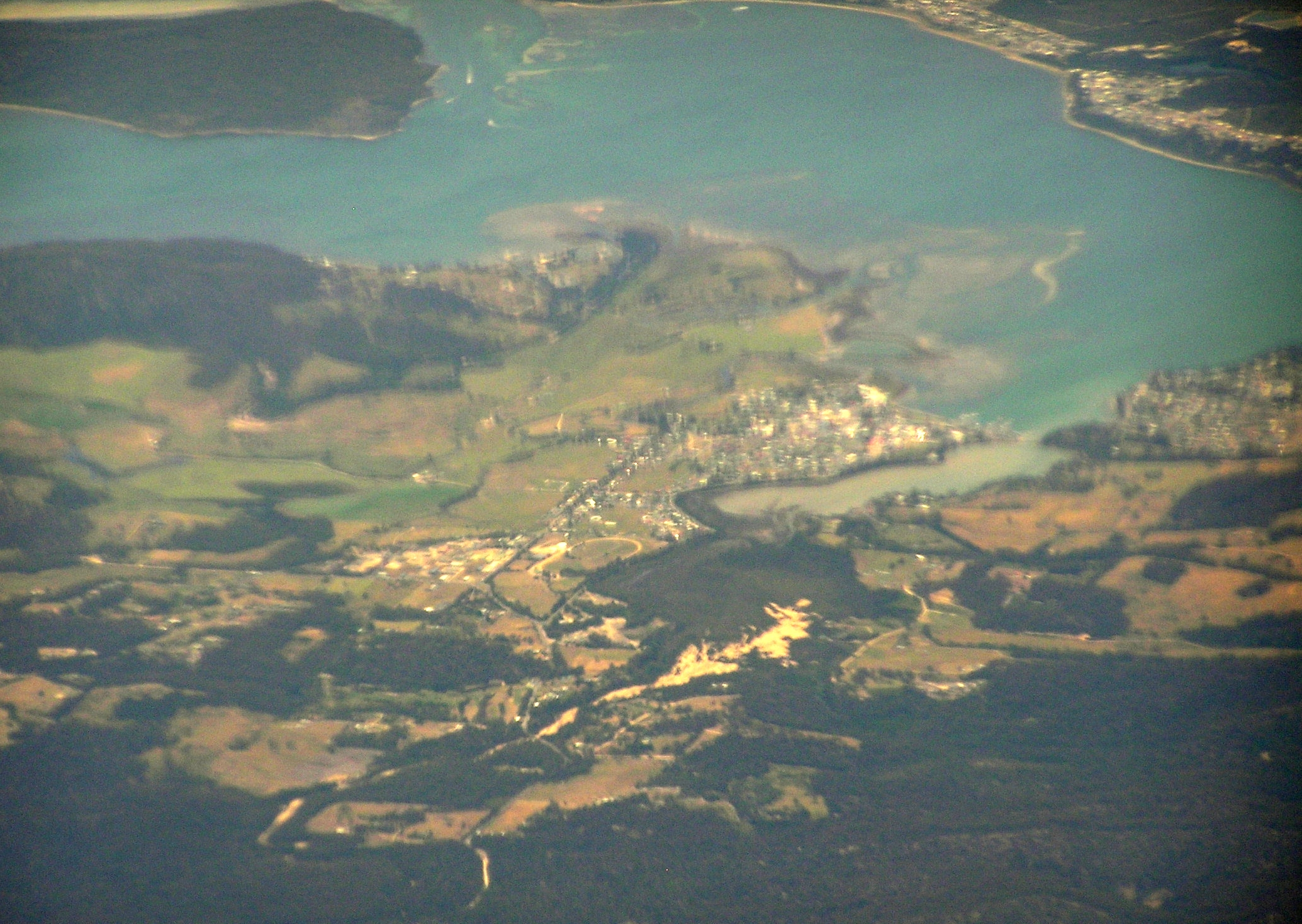
aerial view from west

Georges Bay Post Office opened on 1 April 1869 and was renamed "St Helen's" in 1882.

The first European to explore the St Helens area was Captain Tobias Furneaux who sailed up the coast in 1773. He named the southern point of Georges Bay, St Helens Point.

By the 1830s Georges Bay was being used by whalers and sealers. Not surprisingly the settlement which grew up on the shore became known as Georges Bay and the local Aboriginal people became known as the Georges Bay tribe.

The first official land grant was provided in 1830 and in 1835 the small village was renamed St Helens. It would have continued to be an inconsequential port had not tin been discovered at Blue Tier in 1874. Suddenly the port, and the routes to the tin mines, were awash with miners. Over 1000 Chinese moved through the port. From 1874 until the turn of the century the tin mines prospered.

When the mines closed the miners moved to the coast and many of them settled in St Helens. Slowly the port changed so that today it has a major fishing fleet which is supported by boat building, ships chandlery and other ancillary activities. In recent times tourism, driven by fishing and the town's mild climate, has become important.

In 2018, St Helens hosted Triple J's annual One Night Stand concert. It featured Vance Joy, Peking Duk, Middle Kids, Alex the Astronaut and The Sleepyheads.

Notable residents of St. Helens include Lee Hartney from The Smith Street Band & Tom Busby from Luca Brasi.

== Environment ==
=== Important Bird Area ===
The town is adjacent to the St Helens Important Bird Area, identified as such by BirdLife International because of its importance as a breeding site for seabirds and waders.

=== Waterfalls ===
35 km to the west is Mount Victoria Forest Reserve near the 90-metre (295 ft) high St Columba Falls.

=== Climate ===
St Helens experiences an oceanic climate (Köppen: Cfb. Summers are mild with occasional heatwaves and frequent cold fronts; winters cool and mostly cloudy. Rain falls consistently through the year, peaking slightly from November to March. The town receives 86.1 clear days annually, much higher than Melbourne's 46 days.

Being on the east coast, St Helens' winter temperatures are warmer than most parts of Tasmania due to the foehn effect. Summer temperatures are not as warm as inland areas, however, they are still warmer than those experienced in Hobart. St Helens' record high temperature is 41.8 °C (107 °F) recorded on 30 January 2009, the equal second highest temperature recorded in Tasmania.

Climate data for St Helens Post Office (1981–2001 normals, extremes 1957–2001)
Month	Jan	Feb	Mar	Apr	May	Jun	Jul	Aug	Sep	Oct	Nov	Dec	Year
Record high °C (°F)	39.2 (102.6)	39.8 (103.6)	36.7 (98.1)	28.9 (84.0)	25.7 (78.3)	21.6 (70.9)	21.6 (70.9)	22.4 (72.3)	25.8 (78.4)	31.8 (89.2)	35.6 (96.1)	37.8 (100.0)	39.8 (103.6)
Mean maximum °C (°F)	33.1 (91.6)	33.4 (92.1)	29.6 (85.3)	25.2 (77.4)	21.8 (71.2)	18.8 (65.8)	17.6 (63.7)	19.5 (67.1)	21.6 (70.9)	26.1 (79.0)	28.6 (83.5)	30.7 (87.3)	35.7 (96.3)
Mean daily maximum °C (°F)	23.3 (73.9)	23.5 (74.3)	22.0 (71.6)	19.5 (67.1)	17.1 (62.8)	14.6 (58.3)	14.2 (57.6)	15.1 (59.2)	16.5 (61.7)	18.6 (65.5)	20.2 (68.4)	21.8 (71.2)	18.9 (66.0)
Daily mean °C (°F)	17.9 (64.2)	17.9 (64.2)	16.3 (61.3)	13.7 (56.7)	11.6 (52.9)	9.1 (48.4)	8.4 (47.1)	9.3 (48.7)	10.9 (51.6)	12.8 (55.0)	14.7 (58.5)	16.2 (61.2)	13.2 (55.8)
Mean daily minimum °C (°F)	12.4 (54.3)	12.3 (54.1)	10.5 (50.9)	7.8 (46.0)	6.0 (42.8)	3.5 (38.3)	2.5 (36.5)	3.5 (38.3)	5.2 (41.4)	7.0 (44.6)	9.1 (48.4)	10.6 (51.1)	7.5 (45.6)
Mean minimum °C (°F)	6.4 (43.5)	6.0 (42.8)	3.4 (38.1)	1.3 (34.3)	−0.4 (31.3)	−2.1 (28.2)	−2.6 (27.3)	−1.6 (29.1)	−0.6 (30.9)	0.8 (33.4)	2.6 (36.7)	4.0 (39.2)	−3.2 (26.2)
Record low °C (°F)	1.1 (34.0)	1.2 (34.2)	0.1 (32.2)	−1.7 (28.9)	−2.9 (26.8)	−4.2 (24.4)	−4.3 (24.3)	−3.7 (25.3)	−2.3 (27.9)	−2.1 (28.2)	0.6 (33.1)	−0.6 (30.9)	−4.3 (24.3)
Average rainfall mm (inches)	74.9 (2.95)	30.7 (1.21)	56.2 (2.21)	64.5 (2.54)	52.5 (2.07)	51.3 (2.02)	68.8 (2.71)	60.2 (2.37)	65.9 (2.59)	53.7 (2.11)	65.6 (2.58)	90.4 (3.56)	734.7 (28.92)
Source: Bureau of Meteorology (rainfall 1981–2006)

Climate data for St Helens Aerodrome (2001–2024)
Month	Jan	Feb	Mar	Apr	May	Jun	Jul	Aug	Sep	Oct	Nov	Dec	Year
Record high °C (°F)	41.8 (107.2)	35.6 (96.1)	34.4 (93.9)	28.4 (83.1)	24.1 (75.4)	19.2 (66.6)	19.3 (66.7)	20.9 (69.6)	25.2 (77.4)	29.7 (85.5)	33.8 (92.8)	36.8 (98.2)	41.8 (107.2)
Mean maximum °C (°F)	33.2 (91.8)	30.4 (86.7)	28.1 (82.6)	24.3 (75.7)	20.5 (68.9)	17.7 (63.9)	16.7 (62.1)	18.3 (64.9)	21.3 (70.3)	24.7 (76.5)	27.9 (82.2)	29.8 (85.6)	34.2 (93.6)
Mean daily maximum °C (°F)	22.9 (73.2)	22.1 (71.8)	21.1 (70.0)	18.6 (65.5)	16.1 (61.0)	14.1 (57.4)	13.6 (56.5)	14.3 (57.7)	16.1 (61.0)	17.6 (63.7)	19.5 (67.1)	21.3 (70.3)	18.1 (64.6)
Daily mean °C (°F)	18.2 (64.8)	17.7 (63.9)	16.5 (61.7)	14.1 (57.4)	11.7 (53.1)	9.9 (49.8)	9.3 (48.7)	9.9 (49.8)	11.4 (52.5)	12.9 (55.2)	14.9 (58.8)	16.6 (61.9)	13.6 (56.5)
Mean daily minimum °C (°F)	13.5 (56.3)	13.3 (55.9)	11.9 (53.4)	9.6 (49.3)	7.2 (45.0)	5.6 (42.1)	4.9 (40.8)	5.3 (41.5)	6.7 (44.1)	8.2 (46.8)	10.2 (50.4)	11.8 (53.2)	9.0 (48.2)
Mean minimum °C (°F)	8.0 (46.4)	8.2 (46.8)	5.8 (42.4)	3.9 (39.0)	2.0 (35.6)	0.6 (33.1)	0.5 (32.9)	0.4 (32.7)	1.4 (34.5)	2.8 (37.0)	4.5 (40.1)	6.4 (43.5)	−0.4 (31.3)
Record low °C (°F)	4.8 (40.6)	6.3 (43.3)	3.1 (37.6)	1.3 (34.3)	0.0 (32.0)	−1.0 (30.2)	−0.9 (30.4)	−1.0 (30.2)	−0.3 (31.5)	0.9 (33.6)	1.9 (35.4)	4.3 (39.7)	−1.0 (30.2)
Average precipitation mm (inches)	59.6 (2.35)	61.6 (2.43)	67.7 (2.67)	53.3 (2.10)	48.0 (1.89)	65.9 (2.59)	44.0 (1.73)	55.9 (2.20)	53.0 (2.09)	71.2 (2.80)	77.9 (3.07)	59.2 (2.33)	717.9 (28.26)
Average precipitation days (≥ 0.2 mm)	8.9	10.3	10.2	12.3	13.6	16.8	17.5	16.1	12.7	12.8	12.0	10.9	154.1
Average afternoon relative humidity (%)	58	63	61	64	64	68	67	62	60	60	62	58	62
Source: Australian Bureau of Meteorology

== See also ==
- St Helens Airport
